

213001–213100 

|-bgcolor=#d6d6d6
| 213001 ||  || — || March 2, 1981 || Siding Spring || S. J. Bus || LIX || align=right | 5.3 km || 
|-id=002 bgcolor=#fefefe
| 213002 ||  || — || August 22, 1982 || Siding Spring || A. Lowe || — || align=right | 1.1 km || 
|-id=003 bgcolor=#E9E9E9
| 213003 ||  || — || March 1, 1992 || La Silla || UESAC || — || align=right | 1.5 km || 
|-id=004 bgcolor=#fefefe
| 213004 ||  || — || September 26, 1992 || Kitt Peak || Spacewatch || — || align=right | 2.2 km || 
|-id=005 bgcolor=#d6d6d6
| 213005 ||  || — || September 11, 1993 || Stroncone || A. Vagnozzi || URS || align=right | 5.6 km || 
|-id=006 bgcolor=#E9E9E9
| 213006 ||  || — || September 28, 1994 || Kitt Peak || Spacewatch || EUN || align=right | 1.9 km || 
|-id=007 bgcolor=#fefefe
| 213007 ||  || — || January 29, 1995 || Kitt Peak || Spacewatch || — || align=right data-sort-value="0.68" | 680 m || 
|-id=008 bgcolor=#fefefe
| 213008 ||  || — || February 24, 1995 || Siding Spring || R. H. McNaught || H || align=right data-sort-value="0.90" | 900 m || 
|-id=009 bgcolor=#E9E9E9
| 213009 ||  || — || March 27, 1995 || Kitt Peak || Spacewatch || WIT || align=right | 1.3 km || 
|-id=010 bgcolor=#fefefe
| 213010 ||  || — || July 22, 1995 || Kitt Peak || Spacewatch || — || align=right | 1.1 km || 
|-id=011 bgcolor=#fefefe
| 213011 ||  || — || July 22, 1995 || Kitt Peak || Spacewatch || — || align=right | 1.1 km || 
|-id=012 bgcolor=#fefefe
| 213012 ||  || — || September 18, 1995 || Kitt Peak || Spacewatch || MAS || align=right data-sort-value="0.97" | 970 m || 
|-id=013 bgcolor=#d6d6d6
| 213013 ||  || — || September 19, 1995 || Kitt Peak || Spacewatch || — || align=right | 3.9 km || 
|-id=014 bgcolor=#d6d6d6
| 213014 ||  || — || September 25, 1995 || Kitt Peak || Spacewatch || — || align=right | 3.2 km || 
|-id=015 bgcolor=#fefefe
| 213015 ||  || — || September 26, 1995 || Kitt Peak || Spacewatch || ERI || align=right | 2.0 km || 
|-id=016 bgcolor=#d6d6d6
| 213016 ||  || — || September 26, 1995 || Kitt Peak || Spacewatch || — || align=right | 3.9 km || 
|-id=017 bgcolor=#fefefe
| 213017 ||  || — || September 22, 1995 || Kitt Peak || Spacewatch || EUT || align=right data-sort-value="0.70" | 700 m || 
|-id=018 bgcolor=#fefefe
| 213018 ||  || — || October 17, 1995 || Kitt Peak || Spacewatch || — || align=right | 1.1 km || 
|-id=019 bgcolor=#d6d6d6
| 213019 ||  || — || October 17, 1995 || Kitt Peak || Spacewatch || — || align=right | 2.5 km || 
|-id=020 bgcolor=#d6d6d6
| 213020 ||  || — || October 28, 1995 || Kitt Peak || Spacewatch || — || align=right | 3.3 km || 
|-id=021 bgcolor=#fefefe
| 213021 ||  || — || November 14, 1995 || Kitt Peak || Spacewatch || — || align=right data-sort-value="0.93" | 930 m || 
|-id=022 bgcolor=#fefefe
| 213022 ||  || — || November 15, 1995 || Kitt Peak || Spacewatch || — || align=right | 1.4 km || 
|-id=023 bgcolor=#d6d6d6
| 213023 ||  || — || November 17, 1995 || Kitt Peak || Spacewatch || HYG || align=right | 3.9 km || 
|-id=024 bgcolor=#fefefe
| 213024 ||  || — || November 17, 1995 || Kitt Peak || Spacewatch || — || align=right | 1.2 km || 
|-id=025 bgcolor=#E9E9E9
| 213025 ||  || — || March 19, 1996 || Kitt Peak || Spacewatch || — || align=right | 1.8 km || 
|-id=026 bgcolor=#E9E9E9
| 213026 ||  || — || April 17, 1996 || Kitt Peak || Spacewatch || EUN || align=right | 1.6 km || 
|-id=027 bgcolor=#fefefe
| 213027 ||  || — || November 2, 1996 || Xinglong || SCAP || FLO || align=right | 1.1 km || 
|-id=028 bgcolor=#d6d6d6
| 213028 ||  || — || November 3, 1996 || Kitt Peak || Spacewatch || — || align=right | 4.1 km || 
|-id=029 bgcolor=#fefefe
| 213029 ||  || — || January 31, 1997 || Kitt Peak || Spacewatch || — || align=right | 1.1 km || 
|-id=030 bgcolor=#E9E9E9
| 213030 ||  || — || April 2, 1997 || Socorro || LINEAR || — || align=right | 2.1 km || 
|-id=031 bgcolor=#E9E9E9
| 213031 ||  || — || July 25, 1997 || Caussols || ODAS || — || align=right | 1.5 km || 
|-id=032 bgcolor=#E9E9E9
| 213032 ||  || — || October 3, 1997 || Caussols || ODAS || — || align=right | 2.9 km || 
|-id=033 bgcolor=#E9E9E9
| 213033 ||  || — || October 23, 1997 || Kitt Peak || Spacewatch || — || align=right | 2.2 km || 
|-id=034 bgcolor=#E9E9E9
| 213034 ||  || — || November 23, 1997 || Kitt Peak || Spacewatch || — || align=right | 2.7 km || 
|-id=035 bgcolor=#E9E9E9
| 213035 ||  || — || November 23, 1997 || Kitt Peak || Spacewatch || — || align=right | 3.5 km || 
|-id=036 bgcolor=#E9E9E9
| 213036 ||  || — || November 29, 1997 || Socorro || LINEAR || — || align=right | 3.7 km || 
|-id=037 bgcolor=#d6d6d6
| 213037 ||  || — || March 20, 1998 || Kitt Peak || Spacewatch || — || align=right | 3.5 km || 
|-id=038 bgcolor=#d6d6d6
| 213038 ||  || — || March 22, 1998 || Socorro || LINEAR || — || align=right | 4.8 km || 
|-id=039 bgcolor=#d6d6d6
| 213039 ||  || — || April 2, 1998 || Socorro || LINEAR || — || align=right | 6.5 km || 
|-id=040 bgcolor=#fefefe
| 213040 ||  || — || April 19, 1998 || Kitt Peak || Spacewatch || — || align=right | 1.0 km || 
|-id=041 bgcolor=#fefefe
| 213041 ||  || — || April 20, 1998 || Socorro || LINEAR || — || align=right | 1.1 km || 
|-id=042 bgcolor=#fefefe
| 213042 ||  || — || April 21, 1998 || Socorro || LINEAR || — || align=right | 1.2 km || 
|-id=043 bgcolor=#d6d6d6
| 213043 ||  || — || May 24, 1998 || Kitt Peak || Spacewatch || EOS || align=right | 3.2 km || 
|-id=044 bgcolor=#E9E9E9
| 213044 ||  || — || July 26, 1998 || La Silla || E. W. Elst || — || align=right | 2.1 km || 
|-id=045 bgcolor=#fefefe
| 213045 ||  || — || July 26, 1998 || Kitt Peak || Spacewatch || — || align=right | 1.5 km || 
|-id=046 bgcolor=#E9E9E9
| 213046 ||  || — || August 24, 1998 || Socorro || LINEAR || — || align=right | 1.7 km || 
|-id=047 bgcolor=#E9E9E9
| 213047 ||  || — || September 21, 1998 || La Silla || E. W. Elst || — || align=right | 3.8 km || 
|-id=048 bgcolor=#E9E9E9
| 213048 ||  || — || September 26, 1998 || Socorro || LINEAR || — || align=right | 2.2 km || 
|-id=049 bgcolor=#E9E9E9
| 213049 ||  || — || September 26, 1998 || Socorro || LINEAR || JUN || align=right | 1.6 km || 
|-id=050 bgcolor=#FA8072
| 213050 ||  || — || October 12, 1998 || Ondřejov || L. Kotková || — || align=right data-sort-value="0.86" | 860 m || 
|-id=051 bgcolor=#E9E9E9
| 213051 ||  || — || October 19, 1998 || Xinglong || SCAP || MIT || align=right | 2.8 km || 
|-id=052 bgcolor=#E9E9E9
| 213052 ||  || — || November 10, 1998 || Socorro || LINEAR || BAR || align=right | 2.3 km || 
|-id=053 bgcolor=#FFC2E0
| 213053 ||  || — || November 24, 1998 || Kitt Peak || Spacewatch || AMO || align=right data-sort-value="0.41" | 410 m || 
|-id=054 bgcolor=#E9E9E9
| 213054 ||  || — || January 9, 1999 || Kitt Peak || Spacewatch || — || align=right | 3.3 km || 
|-id=055 bgcolor=#E9E9E9
| 213055 ||  || — || January 14, 1999 || Kitt Peak || Spacewatch || — || align=right | 3.6 km || 
|-id=056 bgcolor=#fefefe
| 213056 ||  || — || May 13, 1999 || Socorro || LINEAR || — || align=right | 1.5 km || 
|-id=057 bgcolor=#d6d6d6
| 213057 ||  || — || July 12, 1999 || Socorro || LINEAR || TIR || align=right | 6.8 km || 
|-id=058 bgcolor=#d6d6d6
| 213058 ||  || — || September 3, 1999 || Kitt Peak || Spacewatch || 7:4 || align=right | 4.4 km || 
|-id=059 bgcolor=#d6d6d6
| 213059 ||  || — || September 14, 1999 || Ondřejov || P. Pravec, P. Kušnirák || HYG || align=right | 4.8 km || 
|-id=060 bgcolor=#fefefe
| 213060 ||  || — || September 7, 1999 || Socorro || LINEAR || NYS || align=right | 1.2 km || 
|-id=061 bgcolor=#d6d6d6
| 213061 ||  || — || September 7, 1999 || Socorro || LINEAR || — || align=right | 5.4 km || 
|-id=062 bgcolor=#fefefe
| 213062 ||  || — || September 7, 1999 || Socorro || LINEAR || — || align=right | 1.1 km || 
|-id=063 bgcolor=#fefefe
| 213063 ||  || — || September 7, 1999 || Socorro || LINEAR || NYS || align=right | 1.1 km || 
|-id=064 bgcolor=#fefefe
| 213064 ||  || — || September 9, 1999 || Socorro || LINEAR || — || align=right | 1.2 km || 
|-id=065 bgcolor=#fefefe
| 213065 ||  || — || September 9, 1999 || Socorro || LINEAR || — || align=right | 1.2 km || 
|-id=066 bgcolor=#fefefe
| 213066 ||  || — || September 9, 1999 || Socorro || LINEAR || — || align=right | 1.4 km || 
|-id=067 bgcolor=#d6d6d6
| 213067 ||  || — || September 30, 1999 || Catalina || CSS || — || align=right | 5.8 km || 
|-id=068 bgcolor=#fefefe
| 213068 ||  || — || September 30, 1999 || Kitt Peak || Spacewatch || NYS || align=right data-sort-value="0.63" | 630 m || 
|-id=069 bgcolor=#fefefe
| 213069 ||  || — || October 4, 1999 || Xinglong || SCAP || KLI || align=right | 3.3 km || 
|-id=070 bgcolor=#fefefe
| 213070 ||  || — || October 4, 1999 || Kitt Peak || Spacewatch || NYS || align=right data-sort-value="0.79" | 790 m || 
|-id=071 bgcolor=#fefefe
| 213071 ||  || — || October 4, 1999 || Kitt Peak || Spacewatch || — || align=right | 1.2 km || 
|-id=072 bgcolor=#fefefe
| 213072 ||  || — || October 11, 1999 || Kitt Peak || Spacewatch || — || align=right data-sort-value="0.95" | 950 m || 
|-id=073 bgcolor=#d6d6d6
| 213073 ||  || — || October 2, 1999 || Socorro || LINEAR || TIR || align=right | 3.4 km || 
|-id=074 bgcolor=#fefefe
| 213074 ||  || — || October 2, 1999 || Socorro || LINEAR || MAS || align=right | 1.1 km || 
|-id=075 bgcolor=#fefefe
| 213075 ||  || — || October 2, 1999 || Socorro || LINEAR || — || align=right | 1.6 km || 
|-id=076 bgcolor=#fefefe
| 213076 ||  || — || October 4, 1999 || Socorro || LINEAR || — || align=right | 1.4 km || 
|-id=077 bgcolor=#fefefe
| 213077 ||  || — || October 4, 1999 || Socorro || LINEAR || — || align=right | 1.3 km || 
|-id=078 bgcolor=#fefefe
| 213078 ||  || — || October 6, 1999 || Socorro || LINEAR || PHO || align=right | 1.4 km || 
|-id=079 bgcolor=#fefefe
| 213079 ||  || — || October 6, 1999 || Socorro || LINEAR || MAS || align=right | 1.0 km || 
|-id=080 bgcolor=#fefefe
| 213080 ||  || — || October 6, 1999 || Socorro || LINEAR || NYS || align=right data-sort-value="0.94" | 940 m || 
|-id=081 bgcolor=#fefefe
| 213081 ||  || — || October 6, 1999 || Socorro || LINEAR || — || align=right | 1.5 km || 
|-id=082 bgcolor=#fefefe
| 213082 ||  || — || October 6, 1999 || Socorro || LINEAR || NYS || align=right data-sort-value="0.89" | 890 m || 
|-id=083 bgcolor=#fefefe
| 213083 ||  || — || October 9, 1999 || Socorro || LINEAR || — || align=right | 1.0 km || 
|-id=084 bgcolor=#FA8072
| 213084 ||  || — || October 10, 1999 || Socorro || LINEAR || — || align=right | 1.0 km || 
|-id=085 bgcolor=#fefefe
| 213085 ||  || — || October 15, 1999 || Socorro || LINEAR || NYS || align=right | 1.1 km || 
|-id=086 bgcolor=#fefefe
| 213086 ||  || — || October 3, 1999 || Anderson Mesa || LONEOS || FLO || align=right | 1.2 km || 
|-id=087 bgcolor=#fefefe
| 213087 ||  || — || October 5, 1999 || Anderson Mesa || LONEOS || — || align=right | 1.3 km || 
|-id=088 bgcolor=#E9E9E9
| 213088 ||  || — || October 8, 1999 || Catalina || CSS || — || align=right | 1.4 km || 
|-id=089 bgcolor=#fefefe
| 213089 ||  || — || October 10, 1999 || Socorro || LINEAR || — || align=right | 1.2 km || 
|-id=090 bgcolor=#d6d6d6
| 213090 ||  || — || October 9, 1999 || Socorro || LINEAR || — || align=right | 5.1 km || 
|-id=091 bgcolor=#E9E9E9
| 213091 ||  || — || October 2, 1999 || Catalina || CSS || — || align=right | 1.5 km || 
|-id=092 bgcolor=#fefefe
| 213092 ||  || — || October 30, 1999 || Kitt Peak || Spacewatch || — || align=right | 1.2 km || 
|-id=093 bgcolor=#E9E9E9
| 213093 ||  || — || October 29, 1999 || Kitt Peak || Spacewatch || — || align=right | 3.0 km || 
|-id=094 bgcolor=#fefefe
| 213094 ||  || — || November 2, 1999 || Kitt Peak || Spacewatch || — || align=right | 1.1 km || 
|-id=095 bgcolor=#d6d6d6
| 213095 ||  || — || November 1, 1999 || Catalina || CSS || THB || align=right | 5.9 km || 
|-id=096 bgcolor=#fefefe
| 213096 ||  || — || November 3, 1999 || Socorro || LINEAR || — || align=right | 1.6 km || 
|-id=097 bgcolor=#fefefe
| 213097 ||  || — || November 9, 1999 || Socorro || LINEAR || — || align=right | 1.4 km || 
|-id=098 bgcolor=#fefefe
| 213098 ||  || — || November 4, 1999 || Kitt Peak || Spacewatch || NYS || align=right | 1.2 km || 
|-id=099 bgcolor=#fefefe
| 213099 ||  || — || November 6, 1999 || Socorro || LINEAR || H || align=right data-sort-value="0.82" | 820 m || 
|-id=100 bgcolor=#E9E9E9
| 213100 ||  || — || November 14, 1999 || Socorro || LINEAR || — || align=right | 1.0 km || 
|}

213101–213200 

|-bgcolor=#fefefe
| 213101 ||  || — || November 3, 1999 || Catalina || CSS || V || align=right | 1.2 km || 
|-id=102 bgcolor=#fefefe
| 213102 ||  || — || November 29, 1999 || Kitt Peak || Spacewatch || H || align=right data-sort-value="0.73" | 730 m || 
|-id=103 bgcolor=#E9E9E9
| 213103 ||  || — || December 4, 1999 || Catalina || CSS || — || align=right | 1.4 km || 
|-id=104 bgcolor=#fefefe
| 213104 ||  || — || December 6, 1999 || Socorro || LINEAR || — || align=right | 1.2 km || 
|-id=105 bgcolor=#fefefe
| 213105 ||  || — || December 7, 1999 || Socorro || LINEAR || NYS || align=right | 1.1 km || 
|-id=106 bgcolor=#E9E9E9
| 213106 ||  || — || December 7, 1999 || Socorro || LINEAR || — || align=right | 1.3 km || 
|-id=107 bgcolor=#E9E9E9
| 213107 ||  || — || December 7, 1999 || Catalina || CSS || — || align=right | 1.8 km || 
|-id=108 bgcolor=#d6d6d6
| 213108 ||  || — || December 7, 1999 || Kitt Peak || Spacewatch || SYL7:4 || align=right | 6.4 km || 
|-id=109 bgcolor=#E9E9E9
| 213109 ||  || — || December 10, 1999 || Socorro || LINEAR || — || align=right | 2.4 km || 
|-id=110 bgcolor=#fefefe
| 213110 ||  || — || December 31, 1999 || Kitt Peak || Spacewatch || — || align=right | 1.4 km || 
|-id=111 bgcolor=#E9E9E9
| 213111 ||  || — || January 2, 2000 || Socorro || LINEAR || — || align=right | 2.3 km || 
|-id=112 bgcolor=#E9E9E9
| 213112 ||  || — || January 3, 2000 || Socorro || LINEAR || — || align=right | 2.0 km || 
|-id=113 bgcolor=#E9E9E9
| 213113 ||  || — || January 4, 2000 || Socorro || LINEAR || — || align=right | 1.2 km || 
|-id=114 bgcolor=#E9E9E9
| 213114 ||  || — || January 4, 2000 || Socorro || LINEAR || — || align=right | 1.6 km || 
|-id=115 bgcolor=#E9E9E9
| 213115 ||  || — || January 5, 2000 || Socorro || LINEAR || — || align=right | 2.5 km || 
|-id=116 bgcolor=#E9E9E9
| 213116 ||  || — || January 6, 2000 || Socorro || LINEAR || — || align=right | 1.9 km || 
|-id=117 bgcolor=#E9E9E9
| 213117 ||  || — || January 7, 2000 || Socorro || LINEAR || — || align=right | 1.1 km || 
|-id=118 bgcolor=#d6d6d6
| 213118 ||  || — || January 7, 2000 || Socorro || LINEAR || — || align=right | 9.1 km || 
|-id=119 bgcolor=#C2FFFF
| 213119 ||  || — || January 8, 2000 || Kitt Peak || Spacewatch || L4 || align=right | 14 km || 
|-id=120 bgcolor=#E9E9E9
| 213120 ||  || — || January 27, 2000 || Kitt Peak || Spacewatch || — || align=right | 6.4 km || 
|-id=121 bgcolor=#E9E9E9
| 213121 ||  || — || February 2, 2000 || Socorro || LINEAR || — || align=right | 1.4 km || 
|-id=122 bgcolor=#E9E9E9
| 213122 ||  || — || February 2, 2000 || Socorro || LINEAR || — || align=right | 2.0 km || 
|-id=123 bgcolor=#E9E9E9
| 213123 ||  || — || February 2, 2000 || Socorro || LINEAR || — || align=right | 2.6 km || 
|-id=124 bgcolor=#E9E9E9
| 213124 ||  || — || February 7, 2000 || Kitt Peak || Spacewatch || — || align=right | 3.6 km || 
|-id=125 bgcolor=#E9E9E9
| 213125 ||  || — || February 8, 2000 || Kitt Peak || Spacewatch || — || align=right | 2.1 km || 
|-id=126 bgcolor=#E9E9E9
| 213126 ||  || — || February 1, 2000 || Catalina || CSS || — || align=right | 4.3 km || 
|-id=127 bgcolor=#E9E9E9
| 213127 ||  || — || February 28, 2000 || Baton Rouge || W. R. Cooney Jr. || — || align=right | 2.4 km || 
|-id=128 bgcolor=#E9E9E9
| 213128 ||  || — || February 29, 2000 || Socorro || LINEAR || — || align=right | 3.6 km || 
|-id=129 bgcolor=#E9E9E9
| 213129 ||  || — || February 29, 2000 || Socorro || LINEAR || — || align=right | 2.6 km || 
|-id=130 bgcolor=#E9E9E9
| 213130 ||  || — || February 29, 2000 || Socorro || LINEAR || ADE || align=right | 2.9 km || 
|-id=131 bgcolor=#E9E9E9
| 213131 ||  || — || February 28, 2000 || Kitt Peak || Spacewatch || — || align=right | 2.0 km || 
|-id=132 bgcolor=#E9E9E9
| 213132 ||  || — || March 8, 2000 || Kitt Peak || Spacewatch || — || align=right | 2.5 km || 
|-id=133 bgcolor=#E9E9E9
| 213133 ||  || — || March 10, 2000 || Socorro || LINEAR || JUN || align=right | 1.5 km || 
|-id=134 bgcolor=#E9E9E9
| 213134 ||  || — || March 8, 2000 || Socorro || LINEAR || — || align=right | 2.9 km || 
|-id=135 bgcolor=#E9E9E9
| 213135 ||  || — || March 6, 2000 || Haleakala || NEAT || — || align=right | 2.8 km || 
|-id=136 bgcolor=#E9E9E9
| 213136 ||  || — || March 1, 2000 || Catalina || CSS || ADE || align=right | 3.6 km || 
|-id=137 bgcolor=#E9E9E9
| 213137 ||  || — || March 29, 2000 || Socorro || LINEAR || EUN || align=right | 2.4 km || 
|-id=138 bgcolor=#E9E9E9
| 213138 ||  || — || March 27, 2000 || Anderson Mesa || LONEOS || — || align=right | 3.6 km || 
|-id=139 bgcolor=#E9E9E9
| 213139 ||  || — || April 5, 2000 || Socorro || LINEAR || — || align=right | 2.8 km || 
|-id=140 bgcolor=#E9E9E9
| 213140 ||  || — || April 5, 2000 || Socorro || LINEAR || — || align=right | 3.7 km || 
|-id=141 bgcolor=#E9E9E9
| 213141 ||  || — || April 6, 2000 || Anderson Mesa || LONEOS || — || align=right | 3.3 km || 
|-id=142 bgcolor=#E9E9E9
| 213142 ||  || — || April 25, 2000 || Kitt Peak || Spacewatch || — || align=right | 2.6 km || 
|-id=143 bgcolor=#E9E9E9
| 213143 ||  || — || April 24, 2000 || Kitt Peak || Spacewatch || HEN || align=right | 1.5 km || 
|-id=144 bgcolor=#E9E9E9
| 213144 ||  || — || April 28, 2000 || Socorro || LINEAR || — || align=right | 4.2 km || 
|-id=145 bgcolor=#E9E9E9
| 213145 ||  || — || April 28, 2000 || Socorro || LINEAR || — || align=right | 3.2 km || 
|-id=146 bgcolor=#E9E9E9
| 213146 ||  || — || April 25, 2000 || Anderson Mesa || LONEOS || — || align=right | 3.0 km || 
|-id=147 bgcolor=#E9E9E9
| 213147 ||  || — || May 4, 2000 || Socorro || LINEAR || — || align=right | 4.6 km || 
|-id=148 bgcolor=#E9E9E9
| 213148 ||  || — || May 2, 2000 || Kitt Peak || Spacewatch || — || align=right | 3.5 km || 
|-id=149 bgcolor=#E9E9E9
| 213149 ||  || — || May 2, 2000 || Anderson Mesa || LONEOS || — || align=right | 4.0 km || 
|-id=150 bgcolor=#E9E9E9
| 213150 ||  || — || May 27, 2000 || Anderson Mesa || LONEOS || POS || align=right | 4.4 km || 
|-id=151 bgcolor=#E9E9E9
| 213151 ||  || — || May 25, 2000 || Anderson Mesa || LONEOS || — || align=right | 2.9 km || 
|-id=152 bgcolor=#FA8072
| 213152 ||  || — || July 5, 2000 || Anderson Mesa || LONEOS || — || align=right data-sort-value="0.83" | 830 m || 
|-id=153 bgcolor=#d6d6d6
| 213153 ||  || — || July 29, 2000 || Anderson Mesa || LONEOS || — || align=right | 4.7 km || 
|-id=154 bgcolor=#fefefe
| 213154 ||  || — || August 4, 2000 || Haleakala || NEAT || — || align=right | 1.4 km || 
|-id=155 bgcolor=#fefefe
| 213155 ||  || — || August 24, 2000 || Socorro || LINEAR || — || align=right | 1.2 km || 
|-id=156 bgcolor=#fefefe
| 213156 ||  || — || August 25, 2000 || Socorro || LINEAR || H || align=right data-sort-value="0.74" | 740 m || 
|-id=157 bgcolor=#d6d6d6
| 213157 ||  || — || August 24, 2000 || Socorro || LINEAR || — || align=right | 4.0 km || 
|-id=158 bgcolor=#FA8072
| 213158 ||  || — || August 25, 2000 || Socorro || LINEAR || — || align=right | 1.0 km || 
|-id=159 bgcolor=#fefefe
| 213159 ||  || — || August 28, 2000 || Socorro || LINEAR || — || align=right | 1.0 km || 
|-id=160 bgcolor=#fefefe
| 213160 ||  || — || August 26, 2000 || Socorro || LINEAR || FLO || align=right data-sort-value="0.98" | 980 m || 
|-id=161 bgcolor=#fefefe
| 213161 ||  || — || September 1, 2000 || Socorro || LINEAR || — || align=right data-sort-value="0.95" | 950 m || 
|-id=162 bgcolor=#d6d6d6
| 213162 ||  || — || September 3, 2000 || Socorro || LINEAR || — || align=right | 3.9 km || 
|-id=163 bgcolor=#d6d6d6
| 213163 ||  || — || September 2, 2000 || Anderson Mesa || LONEOS || — || align=right | 3.8 km || 
|-id=164 bgcolor=#fefefe
| 213164 ||  || — || September 3, 2000 || Socorro || LINEAR || — || align=right | 1.4 km || 
|-id=165 bgcolor=#fefefe
| 213165 ||  || — || September 3, 2000 || Socorro || LINEAR || — || align=right | 1.3 km || 
|-id=166 bgcolor=#d6d6d6
| 213166 ||  || — || September 19, 2000 || Kitt Peak || Spacewatch || THM || align=right | 3.1 km || 
|-id=167 bgcolor=#FA8072
| 213167 ||  || — || September 24, 2000 || Socorro || LINEAR || H || align=right data-sort-value="0.75" | 750 m || 
|-id=168 bgcolor=#fefefe
| 213168 ||  || — || September 24, 2000 || Socorro || LINEAR || — || align=right | 1.1 km || 
|-id=169 bgcolor=#d6d6d6
| 213169 ||  || — || September 24, 2000 || Socorro || LINEAR || EOS || align=right | 2.9 km || 
|-id=170 bgcolor=#fefefe
| 213170 ||  || — || September 24, 2000 || Socorro || LINEAR || FLO || align=right | 1.4 km || 
|-id=171 bgcolor=#fefefe
| 213171 ||  || — || September 24, 2000 || Socorro || LINEAR || — || align=right | 1.3 km || 
|-id=172 bgcolor=#d6d6d6
| 213172 ||  || — || September 24, 2000 || Socorro || LINEAR || EOS || align=right | 3.7 km || 
|-id=173 bgcolor=#fefefe
| 213173 ||  || — || September 24, 2000 || Socorro || LINEAR || FLO || align=right | 1.0 km || 
|-id=174 bgcolor=#fefefe
| 213174 ||  || — || September 24, 2000 || Socorro || LINEAR || FLO || align=right | 1.0 km || 
|-id=175 bgcolor=#fefefe
| 213175 ||  || — || September 24, 2000 || Socorro || LINEAR || — || align=right data-sort-value="0.97" | 970 m || 
|-id=176 bgcolor=#d6d6d6
| 213176 ||  || — || September 24, 2000 || Socorro || LINEAR || — || align=right | 4.3 km || 
|-id=177 bgcolor=#FA8072
| 213177 ||  || — || September 24, 2000 || Socorro || LINEAR || — || align=right | 1.5 km || 
|-id=178 bgcolor=#fefefe
| 213178 ||  || — || September 24, 2000 || Socorro || LINEAR || FLO || align=right data-sort-value="0.97" | 970 m || 
|-id=179 bgcolor=#fefefe
| 213179 ||  || — || September 25, 2000 || Haleakala || NEAT || — || align=right | 1.1 km || 
|-id=180 bgcolor=#C2FFFF
| 213180 ||  || — || September 28, 2000 || Socorro || LINEAR || L5 || align=right | 17 km || 
|-id=181 bgcolor=#d6d6d6
| 213181 ||  || — || September 24, 2000 || Socorro || LINEAR || — || align=right | 2.7 km || 
|-id=182 bgcolor=#d6d6d6
| 213182 ||  || — || September 24, 2000 || Socorro || LINEAR || — || align=right | 4.6 km || 
|-id=183 bgcolor=#fefefe
| 213183 ||  || — || September 26, 2000 || Socorro || LINEAR || — || align=right | 1.5 km || 
|-id=184 bgcolor=#fefefe
| 213184 ||  || — || September 26, 2000 || Socorro || LINEAR || — || align=right | 1.3 km || 
|-id=185 bgcolor=#fefefe
| 213185 ||  || — || September 28, 2000 || Socorro || LINEAR || — || align=right | 1.3 km || 
|-id=186 bgcolor=#fefefe
| 213186 ||  || — || September 27, 2000 || Socorro || LINEAR || NYS || align=right data-sort-value="0.94" | 940 m || 
|-id=187 bgcolor=#fefefe
| 213187 ||  || — || September 24, 2000 || Socorro || LINEAR || — || align=right | 2.2 km || 
|-id=188 bgcolor=#d6d6d6
| 213188 ||  || — || September 24, 2000 || Socorro || LINEAR || EOS || align=right | 3.3 km || 
|-id=189 bgcolor=#d6d6d6
| 213189 ||  || — || September 26, 2000 || Socorro || LINEAR || THM || align=right | 4.1 km || 
|-id=190 bgcolor=#fefefe
| 213190 ||  || — || September 30, 2000 || Socorro || LINEAR || — || align=right | 1.5 km || 
|-id=191 bgcolor=#d6d6d6
| 213191 ||  || — || September 28, 2000 || Socorro || LINEAR || ALA || align=right | 6.0 km || 
|-id=192 bgcolor=#d6d6d6
| 213192 ||  || — || September 23, 2000 || Socorro || LINEAR || — || align=right | 3.5 km || 
|-id=193 bgcolor=#E9E9E9
| 213193 ||  || — || September 28, 2000 || Kitt Peak || Spacewatch || — || align=right | 1.1 km || 
|-id=194 bgcolor=#d6d6d6
| 213194 ||  || — || September 30, 2000 || Socorro || LINEAR || EOS || align=right | 3.4 km || 
|-id=195 bgcolor=#fefefe
| 213195 ||  || — || September 30, 2000 || Kitt Peak || Spacewatch || — || align=right | 1.1 km || 
|-id=196 bgcolor=#d6d6d6
| 213196 ||  || — || September 23, 2000 || Socorro || LINEAR || — || align=right | 4.0 km || 
|-id=197 bgcolor=#d6d6d6
| 213197 ||  || — || September 20, 2000 || Kitt Peak || M. W. Buie || YAK || align=right | 2.8 km || 
|-id=198 bgcolor=#d6d6d6
| 213198 ||  || — || September 30, 2000 || Anderson Mesa || LONEOS || — || align=right | 4.4 km || 
|-id=199 bgcolor=#d6d6d6
| 213199 ||  || — || September 28, 2000 || Anderson Mesa || LONEOS || — || align=right | 5.8 km || 
|-id=200 bgcolor=#d6d6d6
| 213200 ||  || — || September 21, 2000 || Anderson Mesa || LONEOS || — || align=right | 5.0 km || 
|}

213201–213300 

|-bgcolor=#fefefe
| 213201 ||  || — || September 23, 2000 || Anderson Mesa || LONEOS || — || align=right | 1.4 km || 
|-id=202 bgcolor=#fefefe
| 213202 ||  || — || October 1, 2000 || Socorro || LINEAR || NYS || align=right data-sort-value="0.76" | 760 m || 
|-id=203 bgcolor=#fefefe
| 213203 ||  || — || October 1, 2000 || Socorro || LINEAR || — || align=right data-sort-value="0.99" | 990 m || 
|-id=204 bgcolor=#d6d6d6
| 213204 ||  || — || October 1, 2000 || Socorro || LINEAR || EOS || align=right | 2.8 km || 
|-id=205 bgcolor=#fefefe
| 213205 ||  || — || October 1, 2000 || Socorro || LINEAR || — || align=right data-sort-value="0.93" | 930 m || 
|-id=206 bgcolor=#d6d6d6
| 213206 ||  || — || October 6, 2000 || Anderson Mesa || LONEOS || EOS || align=right | 2.3 km || 
|-id=207 bgcolor=#fefefe
| 213207 ||  || — || October 1, 2000 || Socorro || LINEAR || — || align=right | 1.2 km || 
|-id=208 bgcolor=#fefefe
| 213208 ||  || — || October 24, 2000 || Socorro || LINEAR || V || align=right | 1.1 km || 
|-id=209 bgcolor=#d6d6d6
| 213209 ||  || — || October 25, 2000 || Socorro || LINEAR || EOS || align=right | 3.2 km || 
|-id=210 bgcolor=#d6d6d6
| 213210 ||  || — || October 24, 2000 || Socorro || LINEAR || — || align=right | 5.1 km || 
|-id=211 bgcolor=#d6d6d6
| 213211 ||  || — || October 25, 2000 || Socorro || LINEAR || — || align=right | 4.5 km || 
|-id=212 bgcolor=#fefefe
| 213212 ||  || — || October 25, 2000 || Socorro || LINEAR || — || align=right | 3.9 km || 
|-id=213 bgcolor=#fefefe
| 213213 ||  || — || October 31, 2000 || Socorro || LINEAR || — || align=right | 1.1 km || 
|-id=214 bgcolor=#fefefe
| 213214 ||  || — || October 31, 2000 || Socorro || LINEAR || FLO || align=right | 1.1 km || 
|-id=215 bgcolor=#fefefe
| 213215 ||  || — || October 31, 2000 || Socorro || LINEAR || — || align=right | 1.2 km || 
|-id=216 bgcolor=#fefefe
| 213216 ||  || — || October 25, 2000 || Socorro || LINEAR || — || align=right | 1.4 km || 
|-id=217 bgcolor=#fefefe
| 213217 ||  || — || November 1, 2000 || Socorro || LINEAR || — || align=right | 1.4 km || 
|-id=218 bgcolor=#fefefe
| 213218 ||  || — || November 1, 2000 || Socorro || LINEAR || — || align=right | 1.2 km || 
|-id=219 bgcolor=#fefefe
| 213219 ||  || — || November 1, 2000 || Socorro || LINEAR || — || align=right | 1.2 km || 
|-id=220 bgcolor=#d6d6d6
| 213220 ||  || — || November 1, 2000 || Socorro || LINEAR || — || align=right | 8.4 km || 
|-id=221 bgcolor=#fefefe
| 213221 ||  || — || November 1, 2000 || Socorro || LINEAR || NYS || align=right | 1.0 km || 
|-id=222 bgcolor=#d6d6d6
| 213222 ||  || — || November 1, 2000 || Socorro || LINEAR || — || align=right | 5.3 km || 
|-id=223 bgcolor=#fefefe
| 213223 ||  || — || November 20, 2000 || Kitt Peak || Spacewatch || — || align=right | 1.1 km || 
|-id=224 bgcolor=#fefefe
| 213224 ||  || — || November 21, 2000 || Socorro || LINEAR || — || align=right | 1.3 km || 
|-id=225 bgcolor=#d6d6d6
| 213225 ||  || — || November 20, 2000 || Socorro || LINEAR || LIX || align=right | 5.2 km || 
|-id=226 bgcolor=#d6d6d6
| 213226 ||  || — || November 20, 2000 || Socorro || LINEAR || — || align=right | 2.7 km || 
|-id=227 bgcolor=#fefefe
| 213227 ||  || — || November 21, 2000 || Socorro || LINEAR || — || align=right | 1.3 km || 
|-id=228 bgcolor=#d6d6d6
| 213228 ||  || — || November 21, 2000 || Socorro || LINEAR || — || align=right | 6.5 km || 
|-id=229 bgcolor=#d6d6d6
| 213229 ||  || — || November 20, 2000 || Socorro || LINEAR || — || align=right | 4.8 km || 
|-id=230 bgcolor=#fefefe
| 213230 ||  || — || November 20, 2000 || Socorro || LINEAR || FLO || align=right | 3.1 km || 
|-id=231 bgcolor=#fefefe
| 213231 ||  || — || November 21, 2000 || Socorro || LINEAR || V || align=right data-sort-value="0.96" | 960 m || 
|-id=232 bgcolor=#fefefe
| 213232 ||  || — || November 21, 2000 || Socorro || LINEAR || — || align=right | 1.3 km || 
|-id=233 bgcolor=#fefefe
| 213233 ||  || — || November 20, 2000 || Socorro || LINEAR || — || align=right | 1.2 km || 
|-id=234 bgcolor=#d6d6d6
| 213234 ||  || — || November 21, 2000 || Socorro || LINEAR || — || align=right | 4.1 km || 
|-id=235 bgcolor=#fefefe
| 213235 ||  || — || November 27, 2000 || Socorro || LINEAR || FLO || align=right data-sort-value="0.91" | 910 m || 
|-id=236 bgcolor=#fefefe
| 213236 ||  || — || December 4, 2000 || Socorro || LINEAR || — || align=right | 2.4 km || 
|-id=237 bgcolor=#d6d6d6
| 213237 ||  || — || December 4, 2000 || Socorro || LINEAR || EUP || align=right | 7.8 km || 
|-id=238 bgcolor=#fefefe
| 213238 ||  || — || December 19, 2000 || Socorro || LINEAR || — || align=right | 1.3 km || 
|-id=239 bgcolor=#fefefe
| 213239 ||  || — || December 30, 2000 || Socorro || LINEAR || NYS || align=right data-sort-value="0.93" | 930 m || 
|-id=240 bgcolor=#fefefe
| 213240 ||  || — || December 30, 2000 || Socorro || LINEAR || — || align=right | 1.3 km || 
|-id=241 bgcolor=#fefefe
| 213241 ||  || — || January 1, 2001 || Kitt Peak || Spacewatch || KLI || align=right | 2.4 km || 
|-id=242 bgcolor=#E9E9E9
| 213242 ||  || — || January 21, 2001 || Oizumi || T. Kobayashi || — || align=right | 1.6 km || 
|-id=243 bgcolor=#fefefe
| 213243 ||  || — || January 19, 2001 || Socorro || LINEAR || NYS || align=right data-sort-value="0.93" | 930 m || 
|-id=244 bgcolor=#fefefe
| 213244 ||  || — || January 19, 2001 || Socorro || LINEAR || — || align=right | 1.5 km || 
|-id=245 bgcolor=#fefefe
| 213245 ||  || — || January 20, 2001 || Socorro || LINEAR || — || align=right | 1.4 km || 
|-id=246 bgcolor=#fefefe
| 213246 ||  || — || January 26, 2001 || Ondřejov || P. Kušnirák, P. Pravec || MAS || align=right data-sort-value="0.72" | 720 m || 
|-id=247 bgcolor=#fefefe
| 213247 ||  || — || January 17, 2001 || Haleakala || NEAT || — || align=right | 1.4 km || 
|-id=248 bgcolor=#fefefe
| 213248 ||  || — || February 1, 2001 || Socorro || LINEAR || — || align=right | 2.8 km || 
|-id=249 bgcolor=#fefefe
| 213249 ||  || — || February 1, 2001 || Anderson Mesa || LONEOS || — || align=right | 1.3 km || 
|-id=250 bgcolor=#E9E9E9
| 213250 ||  || — || February 14, 2001 || Črni Vrh || Črni Vrh || — || align=right | 4.6 km || 
|-id=251 bgcolor=#fefefe
| 213251 ||  || — || February 15, 2001 || Ondřejov || P. Pravec, L. Kotková || MAS || align=right | 1.2 km || 
|-id=252 bgcolor=#fefefe
| 213252 ||  || — || February 16, 2001 || Kitt Peak || Spacewatch || V || align=right | 1.1 km || 
|-id=253 bgcolor=#fefefe
| 213253 ||  || — || February 17, 2001 || Socorro || LINEAR || NYS || align=right | 2.1 km || 
|-id=254 bgcolor=#fefefe
| 213254 ||  || — || February 16, 2001 || Socorro || LINEAR || — || align=right | 1.3 km || 
|-id=255 bgcolor=#fefefe
| 213255 Kimiyayui ||  ||  || March 15, 2001 || Kuma Kogen || A. Nakamura || H || align=right data-sort-value="0.76" | 760 m || 
|-id=256 bgcolor=#d6d6d6
| 213256 ||  || — || March 15, 2001 || Haleakala || NEAT || BRA || align=right | 2.6 km || 
|-id=257 bgcolor=#fefefe
| 213257 ||  || — || March 15, 2001 || Kitt Peak || Spacewatch || NYS || align=right | 1.1 km || 
|-id=258 bgcolor=#fefefe
| 213258 ||  || — || March 18, 2001 || Socorro || LINEAR || H || align=right | 1.0 km || 
|-id=259 bgcolor=#E9E9E9
| 213259 ||  || — || March 18, 2001 || Socorro || LINEAR || — || align=right | 1.3 km || 
|-id=260 bgcolor=#E9E9E9
| 213260 ||  || — || March 18, 2001 || Socorro || LINEAR || — || align=right | 2.5 km || 
|-id=261 bgcolor=#E9E9E9
| 213261 ||  || — || March 19, 2001 || Socorro || LINEAR || RAF || align=right | 1.5 km || 
|-id=262 bgcolor=#fefefe
| 213262 ||  || — || March 24, 2001 || Socorro || LINEAR || — || align=right | 1.5 km || 
|-id=263 bgcolor=#E9E9E9
| 213263 ||  || — || March 19, 2001 || Anderson Mesa || LONEOS || — || align=right | 4.4 km || 
|-id=264 bgcolor=#fefefe
| 213264 ||  || — || March 26, 2001 || Haleakala || NEAT || — || align=right | 1.4 km || 
|-id=265 bgcolor=#fefefe
| 213265 ||  || — || April 14, 2001 || Kitt Peak || Spacewatch || H || align=right | 1.0 km || 
|-id=266 bgcolor=#fefefe
| 213266 ||  || — || May 23, 2001 || Socorro || LINEAR || H || align=right data-sort-value="0.89" | 890 m || 
|-id=267 bgcolor=#E9E9E9
| 213267 ||  || — || June 15, 2001 || Socorro || LINEAR || — || align=right | 2.2 km || 
|-id=268 bgcolor=#E9E9E9
| 213268 ||  || — || June 15, 2001 || Socorro || LINEAR || — || align=right | 4.0 km || 
|-id=269 bgcolor=#E9E9E9
| 213269 Angelbarbero ||  ||  || June 20, 2001 || Calar Alto || Calar Alto Obs. || — || align=right | 2.2 km || 
|-id=270 bgcolor=#E9E9E9
| 213270 ||  || — || July 9, 2001 || Palomar || NEAT || — || align=right | 2.0 km || 
|-id=271 bgcolor=#E9E9E9
| 213271 ||  || — || July 13, 2001 || Palomar || NEAT || — || align=right | 1.9 km || 
|-id=272 bgcolor=#E9E9E9
| 213272 ||  || — || July 13, 2001 || Haleakala || NEAT || — || align=right | 2.0 km || 
|-id=273 bgcolor=#E9E9E9
| 213273 ||  || — || July 9, 2001 || Palomar || NEAT || — || align=right | 1.7 km || 
|-id=274 bgcolor=#E9E9E9
| 213274 ||  || — || July 19, 2001 || Palomar || NEAT || — || align=right | 3.7 km || 
|-id=275 bgcolor=#E9E9E9
| 213275 ||  || — || July 20, 2001 || Palomar || NEAT || — || align=right | 1.9 km || 
|-id=276 bgcolor=#E9E9E9
| 213276 ||  || — || July 16, 2001 || Anderson Mesa || LONEOS || ADE || align=right | 4.3 km || 
|-id=277 bgcolor=#FA8072
| 213277 ||  || — || July 27, 2001 || Palomar || NEAT || H || align=right | 1.2 km || 
|-id=278 bgcolor=#E9E9E9
| 213278 ||  || — || July 25, 2001 || Kitt Peak || Spacewatch || — || align=right | 2.1 km || 
|-id=279 bgcolor=#E9E9E9
| 213279 ||  || — || July 22, 2001 || Anderson Mesa || LONEOS || — || align=right | 3.5 km || 
|-id=280 bgcolor=#E9E9E9
| 213280 ||  || — || August 8, 2001 || Haleakala || NEAT || — || align=right | 2.3 km || 
|-id=281 bgcolor=#E9E9E9
| 213281 ||  || — || August 9, 2001 || Palomar || NEAT || — || align=right | 2.9 km || 
|-id=282 bgcolor=#E9E9E9
| 213282 ||  || — || August 11, 2001 || Haleakala || NEAT || — || align=right | 2.8 km || 
|-id=283 bgcolor=#E9E9E9
| 213283 ||  || — || August 11, 2001 || Haleakala || NEAT || — || align=right | 3.4 km || 
|-id=284 bgcolor=#E9E9E9
| 213284 ||  || — || August 14, 2001 || Palomar || NEAT || — || align=right | 2.5 km || 
|-id=285 bgcolor=#E9E9E9
| 213285 ||  || — || August 16, 2001 || Socorro || LINEAR || GAL || align=right | 2.8 km || 
|-id=286 bgcolor=#E9E9E9
| 213286 ||  || — || August 17, 2001 || Palomar || NEAT || — || align=right | 2.6 km || 
|-id=287 bgcolor=#E9E9E9
| 213287 ||  || — || August 18, 2001 || Socorro || LINEAR || — || align=right | 2.5 km || 
|-id=288 bgcolor=#E9E9E9
| 213288 ||  || — || August 22, 2001 || Kitt Peak || Spacewatch || — || align=right | 2.0 km || 
|-id=289 bgcolor=#E9E9E9
| 213289 ||  || — || August 21, 2001 || Palomar || NEAT || — || align=right | 1.3 km || 
|-id=290 bgcolor=#E9E9E9
| 213290 ||  || — || August 25, 2001 || Socorro || LINEAR || — || align=right | 2.8 km || 
|-id=291 bgcolor=#E9E9E9
| 213291 ||  || — || August 19, 2001 || Socorro || LINEAR || — || align=right | 3.0 km || 
|-id=292 bgcolor=#E9E9E9
| 213292 ||  || — || August 20, 2001 || Socorro || LINEAR || — || align=right | 2.1 km || 
|-id=293 bgcolor=#E9E9E9
| 213293 ||  || — || August 23, 2001 || Anderson Mesa || LONEOS || — || align=right | 3.6 km || 
|-id=294 bgcolor=#E9E9E9
| 213294 ||  || — || August 23, 2001 || Anderson Mesa || LONEOS || NEM || align=right | 2.7 km || 
|-id=295 bgcolor=#E9E9E9
| 213295 ||  || — || August 23, 2001 || Anderson Mesa || LONEOS || — || align=right | 2.8 km || 
|-id=296 bgcolor=#E9E9E9
| 213296 ||  || — || August 23, 2001 || Anderson Mesa || LONEOS || NEM || align=right | 2.9 km || 
|-id=297 bgcolor=#E9E9E9
| 213297 ||  || — || August 24, 2001 || Haleakala || NEAT || — || align=right | 2.5 km || 
|-id=298 bgcolor=#d6d6d6
| 213298 ||  || — || August 19, 2001 || Socorro || LINEAR || — || align=right | 3.4 km || 
|-id=299 bgcolor=#E9E9E9
| 213299 ||  || — || August 19, 2001 || Socorro || LINEAR || — || align=right | 2.7 km || 
|-id=300 bgcolor=#E9E9E9
| 213300 ||  || — || August 19, 2001 || Socorro || LINEAR || — || align=right | 1.8 km || 
|}

213301–213400 

|-bgcolor=#E9E9E9
| 213301 ||  || — || August 24, 2001 || Anderson Mesa || LONEOS || — || align=right | 3.0 km || 
|-id=302 bgcolor=#d6d6d6
| 213302 ||  || — || August 27, 2001 || Palomar || NEAT || — || align=right | 4.2 km || 
|-id=303 bgcolor=#d6d6d6
| 213303 ||  || — || August 27, 2001 || Palomar || NEAT || — || align=right | 4.9 km || 
|-id=304 bgcolor=#E9E9E9
| 213304 ||  || — || September 7, 2001 || Socorro || LINEAR || — || align=right | 3.3 km || 
|-id=305 bgcolor=#E9E9E9
| 213305 ||  || — || September 10, 2001 || Socorro || LINEAR || GEF || align=right | 2.0 km || 
|-id=306 bgcolor=#E9E9E9
| 213306 ||  || — || September 12, 2001 || Socorro || LINEAR || GEF || align=right | 1.8 km || 
|-id=307 bgcolor=#d6d6d6
| 213307 ||  || — || September 10, 2001 || Socorro || LINEAR || — || align=right | 5.0 km || 
|-id=308 bgcolor=#d6d6d6
| 213308 ||  || — || September 10, 2001 || Socorro || LINEAR || — || align=right | 4.5 km || 
|-id=309 bgcolor=#E9E9E9
| 213309 ||  || — || September 15, 2001 || Palomar || NEAT || — || align=right | 2.3 km || 
|-id=310 bgcolor=#E9E9E9
| 213310 ||  || — || September 11, 2001 || Anderson Mesa || LONEOS || NEM || align=right | 2.2 km || 
|-id=311 bgcolor=#E9E9E9
| 213311 ||  || — || September 12, 2001 || Socorro || LINEAR || — || align=right | 3.6 km || 
|-id=312 bgcolor=#E9E9E9
| 213312 ||  || — || September 12, 2001 || Socorro || LINEAR || AST || align=right | 2.8 km || 
|-id=313 bgcolor=#E9E9E9
| 213313 ||  || — || September 12, 2001 || Socorro || LINEAR || MRX || align=right | 1.9 km || 
|-id=314 bgcolor=#E9E9E9
| 213314 ||  || — || September 19, 2001 || Fountain Hills || C. W. Juels, P. R. Holvorcem || — || align=right | 5.6 km || 
|-id=315 bgcolor=#E9E9E9
| 213315 ||  || — || September 16, 2001 || Socorro || LINEAR || AEO || align=right | 2.0 km || 
|-id=316 bgcolor=#d6d6d6
| 213316 ||  || — || September 16, 2001 || Socorro || LINEAR || — || align=right | 3.8 km || 
|-id=317 bgcolor=#d6d6d6
| 213317 ||  || — || September 16, 2001 || Socorro || LINEAR || EOS || align=right | 2.6 km || 
|-id=318 bgcolor=#d6d6d6
| 213318 ||  || — || September 16, 2001 || Socorro || LINEAR || — || align=right | 4.2 km || 
|-id=319 bgcolor=#E9E9E9
| 213319 ||  || — || September 17, 2001 || Socorro || LINEAR || GEF || align=right | 2.1 km || 
|-id=320 bgcolor=#d6d6d6
| 213320 ||  || — || September 20, 2001 || Socorro || LINEAR || ELF || align=right | 5.9 km || 
|-id=321 bgcolor=#E9E9E9
| 213321 ||  || — || September 16, 2001 || Socorro || LINEAR || — || align=right | 3.5 km || 
|-id=322 bgcolor=#E9E9E9
| 213322 ||  || — || September 16, 2001 || Socorro || LINEAR || — || align=right | 4.6 km || 
|-id=323 bgcolor=#E9E9E9
| 213323 ||  || — || September 16, 2001 || Socorro || LINEAR || — || align=right | 2.4 km || 
|-id=324 bgcolor=#E9E9E9
| 213324 ||  || — || September 16, 2001 || Socorro || LINEAR || GEF || align=right | 3.4 km || 
|-id=325 bgcolor=#E9E9E9
| 213325 ||  || — || September 16, 2001 || Socorro || LINEAR || — || align=right | 3.1 km || 
|-id=326 bgcolor=#d6d6d6
| 213326 ||  || — || September 16, 2001 || Socorro || LINEAR || K-2 || align=right | 1.9 km || 
|-id=327 bgcolor=#d6d6d6
| 213327 ||  || — || September 16, 2001 || Socorro || LINEAR || — || align=right | 3.3 km || 
|-id=328 bgcolor=#d6d6d6
| 213328 ||  || — || September 16, 2001 || Socorro || LINEAR || — || align=right | 3.6 km || 
|-id=329 bgcolor=#E9E9E9
| 213329 ||  || — || September 16, 2001 || Socorro || LINEAR || GEF || align=right | 1.8 km || 
|-id=330 bgcolor=#E9E9E9
| 213330 ||  || — || September 16, 2001 || Socorro || LINEAR || — || align=right | 2.7 km || 
|-id=331 bgcolor=#d6d6d6
| 213331 ||  || — || September 16, 2001 || Socorro || LINEAR || — || align=right | 3.8 km || 
|-id=332 bgcolor=#FA8072
| 213332 ||  || — || September 17, 2001 || Socorro || LINEAR || — || align=right | 1.2 km || 
|-id=333 bgcolor=#E9E9E9
| 213333 ||  || — || September 17, 2001 || Socorro || LINEAR || — || align=right | 3.4 km || 
|-id=334 bgcolor=#d6d6d6
| 213334 ||  || — || September 17, 2001 || Socorro || LINEAR || — || align=right | 3.8 km || 
|-id=335 bgcolor=#E9E9E9
| 213335 ||  || — || September 19, 2001 || Socorro || LINEAR || XIZ || align=right | 2.5 km || 
|-id=336 bgcolor=#E9E9E9
| 213336 ||  || — || September 16, 2001 || Socorro || LINEAR || — || align=right | 2.4 km || 
|-id=337 bgcolor=#d6d6d6
| 213337 ||  || — || September 19, 2001 || Socorro || LINEAR || — || align=right | 3.5 km || 
|-id=338 bgcolor=#E9E9E9
| 213338 ||  || — || September 19, 2001 || Socorro || LINEAR || — || align=right | 3.4 km || 
|-id=339 bgcolor=#E9E9E9
| 213339 ||  || — || September 19, 2001 || Socorro || LINEAR || — || align=right | 2.5 km || 
|-id=340 bgcolor=#E9E9E9
| 213340 ||  || — || September 19, 2001 || Socorro || LINEAR || — || align=right | 1.2 km || 
|-id=341 bgcolor=#d6d6d6
| 213341 ||  || — || September 19, 2001 || Socorro || LINEAR || — || align=right | 4.3 km || 
|-id=342 bgcolor=#d6d6d6
| 213342 ||  || — || September 19, 2001 || Socorro || LINEAR || KOR || align=right | 2.2 km || 
|-id=343 bgcolor=#E9E9E9
| 213343 ||  || — || September 20, 2001 || Kitt Peak || Spacewatch || — || align=right | 2.1 km || 
|-id=344 bgcolor=#E9E9E9
| 213344 ||  || — || September 20, 2001 || Socorro || LINEAR || AGN || align=right | 1.3 km || 
|-id=345 bgcolor=#E9E9E9
| 213345 ||  || — || September 20, 2001 || Socorro || LINEAR || HOF || align=right | 3.0 km || 
|-id=346 bgcolor=#d6d6d6
| 213346 ||  || — || September 20, 2001 || Socorro || LINEAR || EOS || align=right | 2.6 km || 
|-id=347 bgcolor=#C2FFFF
| 213347 ||  || — || September 20, 2001 || Socorro || LINEAR || L5 || align=right | 14 km || 
|-id=348 bgcolor=#E9E9E9
| 213348 ||  || — || September 21, 2001 || Socorro || LINEAR || — || align=right | 3.2 km || 
|-id=349 bgcolor=#E9E9E9
| 213349 ||  || — || September 18, 2001 || Anderson Mesa || LONEOS || — || align=right | 2.9 km || 
|-id=350 bgcolor=#d6d6d6
| 213350 ||  || — || September 18, 2001 || Anderson Mesa || LONEOS || KAR || align=right | 1.7 km || 
|-id=351 bgcolor=#C2FFFF
| 213351 ||  || — || September 19, 2001 || Socorro || LINEAR || L5 || align=right | 10 km || 
|-id=352 bgcolor=#d6d6d6
| 213352 ||  || — || September 21, 2001 || Socorro || LINEAR || CHA || align=right | 2.4 km || 
|-id=353 bgcolor=#d6d6d6
| 213353 ||  || — || October 6, 2001 || Palomar || NEAT || — || align=right | 3.3 km || 
|-id=354 bgcolor=#E9E9E9
| 213354 ||  || — || October 13, 2001 || Socorro || LINEAR || — || align=right | 2.9 km || 
|-id=355 bgcolor=#E9E9E9
| 213355 ||  || — || October 11, 2001 || Palomar || NEAT || — || align=right | 1.7 km || 
|-id=356 bgcolor=#E9E9E9
| 213356 ||  || — || October 13, 2001 || Socorro || LINEAR || — || align=right | 1.1 km || 
|-id=357 bgcolor=#E9E9E9
| 213357 ||  || — || October 13, 2001 || Socorro || LINEAR || DOR || align=right | 3.7 km || 
|-id=358 bgcolor=#d6d6d6
| 213358 ||  || — || October 13, 2001 || Socorro || LINEAR || — || align=right | 4.1 km || 
|-id=359 bgcolor=#E9E9E9
| 213359 ||  || — || October 14, 2001 || Socorro || LINEAR || — || align=right | 2.9 km || 
|-id=360 bgcolor=#C2FFFF
| 213360 ||  || — || October 14, 2001 || Socorro || LINEAR || L5 || align=right | 14 km || 
|-id=361 bgcolor=#E9E9E9
| 213361 ||  || — || October 15, 2001 || Socorro || LINEAR || — || align=right | 3.4 km || 
|-id=362 bgcolor=#E9E9E9
| 213362 ||  || — || October 12, 2001 || Haleakala || NEAT || DOR || align=right | 3.8 km || 
|-id=363 bgcolor=#E9E9E9
| 213363 ||  || — || October 10, 2001 || Palomar || NEAT || GER || align=right | 3.4 km || 
|-id=364 bgcolor=#d6d6d6
| 213364 ||  || — || October 10, 2001 || Palomar || NEAT || — || align=right | 4.2 km || 
|-id=365 bgcolor=#E9E9E9
| 213365 ||  || — || October 10, 2001 || Palomar || NEAT || — || align=right | 2.5 km || 
|-id=366 bgcolor=#d6d6d6
| 213366 ||  || — || October 14, 2001 || Kitt Peak || Spacewatch || — || align=right | 2.9 km || 
|-id=367 bgcolor=#E9E9E9
| 213367 ||  || — || October 14, 2001 || Socorro || LINEAR || — || align=right | 3.0 km || 
|-id=368 bgcolor=#E9E9E9
| 213368 ||  || — || October 14, 2001 || Socorro || LINEAR || — || align=right | 2.4 km || 
|-id=369 bgcolor=#d6d6d6
| 213369 ||  || — || October 14, 2001 || Socorro || LINEAR || — || align=right | 6.2 km || 
|-id=370 bgcolor=#d6d6d6
| 213370 ||  || — || October 11, 2001 || Socorro || LINEAR || — || align=right | 5.4 km || 
|-id=371 bgcolor=#E9E9E9
| 213371 ||  || — || October 13, 2001 || Palomar || NEAT || — || align=right | 4.1 km || 
|-id=372 bgcolor=#d6d6d6
| 213372 ||  || — || October 14, 2001 || Kitt Peak || Spacewatch || — || align=right | 3.6 km || 
|-id=373 bgcolor=#d6d6d6
| 213373 ||  || — || October 15, 2001 || Kitt Peak || Spacewatch || THM || align=right | 2.5 km || 
|-id=374 bgcolor=#d6d6d6
| 213374 ||  || — || October 14, 2001 || Apache Point || SDSS || CHA || align=right | 2.3 km || 
|-id=375 bgcolor=#E9E9E9
| 213375 ||  || — || October 14, 2001 || Apache Point || SDSS || — || align=right | 2.8 km || 
|-id=376 bgcolor=#d6d6d6
| 213376 ||  || — || October 18, 2001 || Socorro || LINEAR || TIR || align=right | 4.0 km || 
|-id=377 bgcolor=#E9E9E9
| 213377 ||  || — || October 18, 2001 || Palomar || NEAT || AGN || align=right | 1.9 km || 
|-id=378 bgcolor=#d6d6d6
| 213378 ||  || — || October 16, 2001 || Socorro || LINEAR || NAE || align=right | 5.1 km || 
|-id=379 bgcolor=#E9E9E9
| 213379 ||  || — || October 17, 2001 || Socorro || LINEAR || — || align=right | 3.6 km || 
|-id=380 bgcolor=#d6d6d6
| 213380 ||  || — || October 17, 2001 || Socorro || LINEAR || — || align=right | 3.3 km || 
|-id=381 bgcolor=#d6d6d6
| 213381 ||  || — || October 17, 2001 || Socorro || LINEAR || — || align=right | 4.2 km || 
|-id=382 bgcolor=#d6d6d6
| 213382 ||  || — || October 17, 2001 || Socorro || LINEAR || — || align=right | 5.3 km || 
|-id=383 bgcolor=#E9E9E9
| 213383 ||  || — || October 17, 2001 || Socorro || LINEAR || — || align=right | 2.3 km || 
|-id=384 bgcolor=#E9E9E9
| 213384 ||  || — || October 20, 2001 || Haleakala || NEAT || — || align=right | 3.7 km || 
|-id=385 bgcolor=#d6d6d6
| 213385 ||  || — || October 20, 2001 || Socorro || LINEAR || — || align=right | 4.2 km || 
|-id=386 bgcolor=#d6d6d6
| 213386 ||  || — || October 17, 2001 || Socorro || LINEAR || THM || align=right | 3.3 km || 
|-id=387 bgcolor=#d6d6d6
| 213387 ||  || — || October 22, 2001 || Socorro || LINEAR || EOS || align=right | 2.4 km || 
|-id=388 bgcolor=#E9E9E9
| 213388 ||  || — || October 20, 2001 || Socorro || LINEAR || XIZ || align=right | 2.6 km || 
|-id=389 bgcolor=#d6d6d6
| 213389 ||  || — || October 23, 2001 || Socorro || LINEAR || THM || align=right | 3.0 km || 
|-id=390 bgcolor=#d6d6d6
| 213390 ||  || — || October 23, 2001 || Socorro || LINEAR || — || align=right | 3.5 km || 
|-id=391 bgcolor=#fefefe
| 213391 ||  || — || October 23, 2001 || Socorro || LINEAR || EUT || align=right | 1.0 km || 
|-id=392 bgcolor=#d6d6d6
| 213392 ||  || — || October 23, 2001 || Socorro || LINEAR || — || align=right | 4.3 km || 
|-id=393 bgcolor=#d6d6d6
| 213393 ||  || — || October 18, 2001 || Palomar || NEAT || — || align=right | 3.0 km || 
|-id=394 bgcolor=#C2FFFF
| 213394 ||  || — || October 17, 2001 || Palomar || NEAT || L5 || align=right | 13 km || 
|-id=395 bgcolor=#E9E9E9
| 213395 ||  || — || October 18, 2001 || Palomar || NEAT || — || align=right | 2.3 km || 
|-id=396 bgcolor=#d6d6d6
| 213396 ||  || — || October 19, 2001 || Anderson Mesa || LONEOS || — || align=right | 3.5 km || 
|-id=397 bgcolor=#d6d6d6
| 213397 ||  || — || October 19, 2001 || Palomar || NEAT || — || align=right | 3.8 km || 
|-id=398 bgcolor=#d6d6d6
| 213398 ||  || — || October 28, 2001 || Palomar || NEAT || — || align=right | 3.7 km || 
|-id=399 bgcolor=#E9E9E9
| 213399 ||  || — || October 25, 2001 || Palomar || NEAT || — || align=right | 2.0 km || 
|-id=400 bgcolor=#d6d6d6
| 213400 ||  || — || November 9, 2001 || Kitt Peak || Spacewatch || — || align=right | 3.1 km || 
|}

213401–213500 

|-bgcolor=#E9E9E9
| 213401 ||  || — || November 10, 2001 || Socorro || LINEAR || DOR || align=right | 4.5 km || 
|-id=402 bgcolor=#d6d6d6
| 213402 ||  || — || November 12, 2001 || Socorro || LINEAR || — || align=right | 4.5 km || 
|-id=403 bgcolor=#d6d6d6
| 213403 ||  || — || November 16, 2001 || Kitt Peak || Spacewatch || THM || align=right | 2.9 km || 
|-id=404 bgcolor=#d6d6d6
| 213404 ||  || — || November 16, 2001 || Kitt Peak || Spacewatch || — || align=right | 5.2 km || 
|-id=405 bgcolor=#d6d6d6
| 213405 ||  || — || November 17, 2001 || Socorro || LINEAR || 615 || align=right | 2.4 km || 
|-id=406 bgcolor=#E9E9E9
| 213406 ||  || — || November 17, 2001 || Socorro || LINEAR || — || align=right | 3.0 km || 
|-id=407 bgcolor=#d6d6d6
| 213407 ||  || — || November 17, 2001 || Kitt Peak || Spacewatch || — || align=right | 3.0 km || 
|-id=408 bgcolor=#d6d6d6
| 213408 ||  || — || November 17, 2001 || Socorro || LINEAR || Tj (2.97) || align=right | 6.5 km || 
|-id=409 bgcolor=#E9E9E9
| 213409 ||  || — || November 17, 2001 || Socorro || LINEAR || — || align=right | 4.9 km || 
|-id=410 bgcolor=#E9E9E9
| 213410 ||  || — || November 19, 2001 || Socorro || LINEAR || — || align=right | 3.5 km || 
|-id=411 bgcolor=#d6d6d6
| 213411 ||  || — || November 19, 2001 || Socorro || LINEAR || — || align=right | 3.2 km || 
|-id=412 bgcolor=#d6d6d6
| 213412 ||  || — || November 20, 2001 || Socorro || LINEAR || — || align=right | 2.9 km || 
|-id=413 bgcolor=#d6d6d6
| 213413 ||  || — || November 20, 2001 || Socorro || LINEAR || — || align=right | 4.3 km || 
|-id=414 bgcolor=#d6d6d6
| 213414 ||  || — || November 20, 2001 || Socorro || LINEAR || — || align=right | 4.6 km || 
|-id=415 bgcolor=#E9E9E9
| 213415 ||  || — || November 19, 2001 || Socorro || LINEAR || DOR || align=right | 4.1 km || 
|-id=416 bgcolor=#d6d6d6
| 213416 ||  || — || December 9, 2001 || Socorro || LINEAR || HYG || align=right | 3.8 km || 
|-id=417 bgcolor=#d6d6d6
| 213417 ||  || — || December 7, 2001 || Cima Ekar || ADAS || — || align=right | 4.7 km || 
|-id=418 bgcolor=#d6d6d6
| 213418 ||  || — || December 10, 2001 || Kitt Peak || Spacewatch || — || align=right | 5.8 km || 
|-id=419 bgcolor=#d6d6d6
| 213419 ||  || — || December 9, 2001 || Socorro || LINEAR || — || align=right | 4.7 km || 
|-id=420 bgcolor=#d6d6d6
| 213420 ||  || — || December 9, 2001 || Socorro || LINEAR || — || align=right | 4.9 km || 
|-id=421 bgcolor=#fefefe
| 213421 ||  || — || December 10, 2001 || Socorro || LINEAR || — || align=right data-sort-value="0.94" | 940 m || 
|-id=422 bgcolor=#d6d6d6
| 213422 ||  || — || December 11, 2001 || Socorro || LINEAR || URS || align=right | 5.1 km || 
|-id=423 bgcolor=#fefefe
| 213423 ||  || — || December 14, 2001 || Kitt Peak || Spacewatch || — || align=right data-sort-value="0.90" | 900 m || 
|-id=424 bgcolor=#d6d6d6
| 213424 ||  || — || December 13, 2001 || Uccle || H. Boffin || — || align=right | 4.6 km || 
|-id=425 bgcolor=#fefefe
| 213425 ||  || — || December 10, 2001 || Socorro || LINEAR || — || align=right | 1.4 km || 
|-id=426 bgcolor=#d6d6d6
| 213426 ||  || — || December 14, 2001 || Socorro || LINEAR || EOS || align=right | 2.5 km || 
|-id=427 bgcolor=#d6d6d6
| 213427 ||  || — || December 14, 2001 || Socorro || LINEAR || THM || align=right | 2.9 km || 
|-id=428 bgcolor=#fefefe
| 213428 ||  || — || December 14, 2001 || Socorro || LINEAR || FLO || align=right data-sort-value="0.96" | 960 m || 
|-id=429 bgcolor=#E9E9E9
| 213429 ||  || — || December 15, 2001 || Socorro || LINEAR || — || align=right | 4.7 km || 
|-id=430 bgcolor=#fefefe
| 213430 ||  || — || December 14, 2001 || Bergisch Gladbach || W. Bickel || NYS || align=right | 1.1 km || 
|-id=431 bgcolor=#fefefe
| 213431 ||  || — || December 15, 2001 || Socorro || LINEAR || — || align=right | 1.2 km || 
|-id=432 bgcolor=#fefefe
| 213432 ||  || — || December 15, 2001 || Socorro || LINEAR || — || align=right | 1.5 km || 
|-id=433 bgcolor=#d6d6d6
| 213433 ||  || — || December 8, 2001 || Anderson Mesa || LONEOS || — || align=right | 4.4 km || 
|-id=434 bgcolor=#d6d6d6
| 213434 ||  || — || December 8, 2001 || Anderson Mesa || LONEOS || — || align=right | 4.4 km || 
|-id=435 bgcolor=#d6d6d6
| 213435 ||  || — || December 17, 2001 || Kitt Peak || Spacewatch || — || align=right | 4.6 km || 
|-id=436 bgcolor=#d6d6d6
| 213436 ||  || — || December 20, 2001 || Cima Ekar || ADAS || — || align=right | 4.1 km || 
|-id=437 bgcolor=#fefefe
| 213437 ||  || — || December 17, 2001 || Socorro || LINEAR || — || align=right | 1.2 km || 
|-id=438 bgcolor=#d6d6d6
| 213438 ||  || — || December 17, 2001 || Socorro || LINEAR || — || align=right | 5.1 km || 
|-id=439 bgcolor=#d6d6d6
| 213439 ||  || — || December 18, 2001 || Socorro || LINEAR || — || align=right | 3.6 km || 
|-id=440 bgcolor=#d6d6d6
| 213440 ||  || — || December 17, 2001 || Socorro || LINEAR || — || align=right | 4.9 km || 
|-id=441 bgcolor=#d6d6d6
| 213441 ||  || — || January 5, 2002 || Cima Ekar || ADAS || — || align=right | 3.8 km || 
|-id=442 bgcolor=#fefefe
| 213442 ||  || — || January 5, 2002 || Haleakala || NEAT || FLO || align=right data-sort-value="0.75" | 750 m || 
|-id=443 bgcolor=#fefefe
| 213443 ||  || — || January 7, 2002 || Palomar || NEAT || — || align=right | 1.3 km || 
|-id=444 bgcolor=#d6d6d6
| 213444 ||  || — || January 9, 2002 || Socorro || LINEAR || — || align=right | 3.7 km || 
|-id=445 bgcolor=#d6d6d6
| 213445 ||  || — || January 9, 2002 || Socorro || LINEAR || — || align=right | 5.2 km || 
|-id=446 bgcolor=#fefefe
| 213446 ||  || — || January 13, 2002 || Socorro || LINEAR || — || align=right | 1.3 km || 
|-id=447 bgcolor=#fefefe
| 213447 ||  || — || January 13, 2002 || Socorro || LINEAR || — || align=right data-sort-value="0.98" | 980 m || 
|-id=448 bgcolor=#fefefe
| 213448 ||  || — || January 14, 2002 || Socorro || LINEAR || — || align=right | 1.7 km || 
|-id=449 bgcolor=#fefefe
| 213449 ||  || — || January 14, 2002 || Socorro || LINEAR || — || align=right | 1.2 km || 
|-id=450 bgcolor=#fefefe
| 213450 ||  || — || February 6, 2002 || Socorro || LINEAR || — || align=right | 1.4 km || 
|-id=451 bgcolor=#fefefe
| 213451 ||  || — || February 6, 2002 || Socorro || LINEAR || — || align=right | 1.5 km || 
|-id=452 bgcolor=#fefefe
| 213452 ||  || — || February 6, 2002 || Socorro || LINEAR || — || align=right | 1.1 km || 
|-id=453 bgcolor=#fefefe
| 213453 ||  || — || February 7, 2002 || Socorro || LINEAR || — || align=right | 1.1 km || 
|-id=454 bgcolor=#fefefe
| 213454 ||  || — || February 3, 2002 || Haleakala || NEAT || — || align=right data-sort-value="0.96" | 960 m || 
|-id=455 bgcolor=#fefefe
| 213455 ||  || — || February 7, 2002 || Socorro || LINEAR || FLO || align=right data-sort-value="0.90" | 900 m || 
|-id=456 bgcolor=#fefefe
| 213456 ||  || — || February 7, 2002 || Socorro || LINEAR || — || align=right | 1.00 km || 
|-id=457 bgcolor=#fefefe
| 213457 ||  || — || February 10, 2002 || Socorro || LINEAR || — || align=right data-sort-value="0.93" | 930 m || 
|-id=458 bgcolor=#fefefe
| 213458 ||  || — || February 8, 2002 || Socorro || LINEAR || — || align=right data-sort-value="0.95" | 950 m || 
|-id=459 bgcolor=#d6d6d6
| 213459 ||  || — || February 8, 2002 || Socorro || LINEAR || MEL || align=right | 5.0 km || 
|-id=460 bgcolor=#fefefe
| 213460 ||  || — || February 10, 2002 || Socorro || LINEAR || — || align=right data-sort-value="0.87" | 870 m || 
|-id=461 bgcolor=#fefefe
| 213461 ||  || — || February 10, 2002 || Socorro || LINEAR || — || align=right data-sort-value="0.92" | 920 m || 
|-id=462 bgcolor=#d6d6d6
| 213462 ||  || — || February 10, 2002 || Socorro || LINEAR || 7:4 || align=right | 4.2 km || 
|-id=463 bgcolor=#fefefe
| 213463 ||  || — || February 8, 2002 || Socorro || LINEAR || — || align=right | 1.3 km || 
|-id=464 bgcolor=#d6d6d6
| 213464 ||  || — || February 11, 2002 || Socorro || LINEAR || VER || align=right | 4.3 km || 
|-id=465 bgcolor=#d6d6d6
| 213465 ||  || — || February 8, 2002 || Kitt Peak || Spacewatch || LUT || align=right | 5.9 km || 
|-id=466 bgcolor=#fefefe
| 213466 ||  || — || February 10, 2002 || Kitt Peak || Spacewatch || — || align=right data-sort-value="0.61" | 610 m || 
|-id=467 bgcolor=#fefefe
| 213467 ||  || — || February 12, 2002 || Socorro || LINEAR || FLO || align=right | 2.3 km || 
|-id=468 bgcolor=#fefefe
| 213468 ||  || — || March 12, 2002 || Črni Vrh || Črni Vrh || — || align=right | 1.5 km || 
|-id=469 bgcolor=#fefefe
| 213469 ||  || — || March 13, 2002 || Socorro || LINEAR || FLO || align=right | 1.1 km || 
|-id=470 bgcolor=#fefefe
| 213470 ||  || — || March 9, 2002 || Socorro || LINEAR || — || align=right | 1.3 km || 
|-id=471 bgcolor=#fefefe
| 213471 ||  || — || March 12, 2002 || Socorro || LINEAR || — || align=right | 1.2 km || 
|-id=472 bgcolor=#fefefe
| 213472 ||  || — || March 14, 2002 || Socorro || LINEAR || — || align=right data-sort-value="0.88" | 880 m || 
|-id=473 bgcolor=#fefefe
| 213473 ||  || — || March 3, 2002 || Haleakala || NEAT || — || align=right | 1.2 km || 
|-id=474 bgcolor=#fefefe
| 213474 ||  || — || March 10, 2002 || Haleakala || NEAT || FLO || align=right data-sort-value="0.92" | 920 m || 
|-id=475 bgcolor=#fefefe
| 213475 ||  || — || March 11, 2002 || Kitt Peak || Spacewatch || — || align=right data-sort-value="0.97" | 970 m || 
|-id=476 bgcolor=#fefefe
| 213476 ||  || — || March 13, 2002 || Kitt Peak || Spacewatch || — || align=right | 1.0 km || 
|-id=477 bgcolor=#fefefe
| 213477 ||  || — || March 13, 2002 || Palomar || NEAT || — || align=right data-sort-value="0.81" | 810 m || 
|-id=478 bgcolor=#fefefe
| 213478 ||  || — || March 14, 2002 || Anderson Mesa || LONEOS || — || align=right | 1.1 km || 
|-id=479 bgcolor=#fefefe
| 213479 ||  || — || March 12, 2002 || Palomar || NEAT || — || align=right | 1.2 km || 
|-id=480 bgcolor=#fefefe
| 213480 ||  || — || March 15, 2002 || Palomar || NEAT || slow || align=right | 1.3 km || 
|-id=481 bgcolor=#fefefe
| 213481 ||  || — || March 5, 2002 || Apache Point || SDSS || V || align=right data-sort-value="0.95" | 950 m || 
|-id=482 bgcolor=#fefefe
| 213482 ||  || — || March 20, 2002 || Socorro || LINEAR || — || align=right | 3.0 km || 
|-id=483 bgcolor=#fefefe
| 213483 ||  || — || March 16, 2002 || Socorro || LINEAR || — || align=right | 1.2 km || 
|-id=484 bgcolor=#fefefe
| 213484 ||  || — || March 16, 2002 || Socorro || LINEAR || FLO || align=right data-sort-value="0.98" | 980 m || 
|-id=485 bgcolor=#fefefe
| 213485 ||  || — || March 16, 2002 || Haleakala || NEAT || — || align=right | 3.4 km || 
|-id=486 bgcolor=#fefefe
| 213486 ||  || — || March 16, 2002 || Haleakala || NEAT || — || align=right | 1.5 km || 
|-id=487 bgcolor=#fefefe
| 213487 ||  || — || March 19, 2002 || Anderson Mesa || LONEOS || FLO || align=right data-sort-value="0.89" | 890 m || 
|-id=488 bgcolor=#fefefe
| 213488 ||  || — || March 31, 2002 || Palomar || NEAT || PHO || align=right | 1.3 km || 
|-id=489 bgcolor=#fefefe
| 213489 ||  || — || April 12, 2002 || Haleakala || NEAT || — || align=right | 1.3 km || 
|-id=490 bgcolor=#fefefe
| 213490 ||  || — || April 14, 2002 || Socorro || LINEAR || — || align=right | 1.2 km || 
|-id=491 bgcolor=#C2FFFF
| 213491 ||  || — || April 15, 2002 || Socorro || LINEAR || L4 || align=right | 16 km || 
|-id=492 bgcolor=#fefefe
| 213492 ||  || — || April 14, 2002 || Palomar || NEAT || — || align=right | 1.6 km || 
|-id=493 bgcolor=#fefefe
| 213493 ||  || — || April 2, 2002 || Kitt Peak || Spacewatch || — || align=right | 1.0 km || 
|-id=494 bgcolor=#fefefe
| 213494 ||  || — || April 3, 2002 || Kitt Peak || Spacewatch || — || align=right | 1.8 km || 
|-id=495 bgcolor=#fefefe
| 213495 ||  || — || April 3, 2002 || Kitt Peak || Spacewatch || NYS || align=right data-sort-value="0.72" | 720 m || 
|-id=496 bgcolor=#fefefe
| 213496 ||  || — || April 4, 2002 || Palomar || NEAT || — || align=right data-sort-value="0.88" | 880 m || 
|-id=497 bgcolor=#fefefe
| 213497 ||  || — || April 5, 2002 || Palomar || NEAT || NYS || align=right data-sort-value="0.84" | 840 m || 
|-id=498 bgcolor=#fefefe
| 213498 ||  || — || April 4, 2002 || Palomar || NEAT || — || align=right | 1.1 km || 
|-id=499 bgcolor=#fefefe
| 213499 ||  || — || April 5, 2002 || Anderson Mesa || LONEOS || FLO || align=right | 1.0 km || 
|-id=500 bgcolor=#fefefe
| 213500 ||  || — || April 5, 2002 || Palomar || NEAT || — || align=right data-sort-value="0.84" | 840 m || 
|}

213501–213600 

|-bgcolor=#fefefe
| 213501 ||  || — || April 9, 2002 || Anderson Mesa || LONEOS || V || align=right | 1.3 km || 
|-id=502 bgcolor=#fefefe
| 213502 ||  || — || April 9, 2002 || Anderson Mesa || LONEOS || — || align=right | 1.2 km || 
|-id=503 bgcolor=#fefefe
| 213503 ||  || — || April 10, 2002 || Socorro || LINEAR || — || align=right | 1.3 km || 
|-id=504 bgcolor=#fefefe
| 213504 ||  || — || April 10, 2002 || Socorro || LINEAR || — || align=right | 1.2 km || 
|-id=505 bgcolor=#fefefe
| 213505 ||  || — || April 10, 2002 || Socorro || LINEAR || FLO || align=right data-sort-value="0.72" | 720 m || 
|-id=506 bgcolor=#fefefe
| 213506 ||  || — || April 10, 2002 || Socorro || LINEAR || V || align=right data-sort-value="0.94" | 940 m || 
|-id=507 bgcolor=#fefefe
| 213507 ||  || — || April 10, 2002 || Socorro || LINEAR || FLO || align=right | 1.1 km || 
|-id=508 bgcolor=#fefefe
| 213508 ||  || — || April 9, 2002 || Anderson Mesa || LONEOS || V || align=right | 1.0 km || 
|-id=509 bgcolor=#fefefe
| 213509 ||  || — || April 9, 2002 || Palomar || NEAT || — || align=right | 2.7 km || 
|-id=510 bgcolor=#fefefe
| 213510 ||  || — || April 9, 2002 || Socorro || LINEAR || — || align=right | 1.2 km || 
|-id=511 bgcolor=#fefefe
| 213511 ||  || — || April 10, 2002 || Socorro || LINEAR || V || align=right data-sort-value="0.97" | 970 m || 
|-id=512 bgcolor=#fefefe
| 213512 ||  || — || April 12, 2002 || Palomar || NEAT || NYS || align=right data-sort-value="0.91" | 910 m || 
|-id=513 bgcolor=#fefefe
| 213513 ||  || — || April 10, 2002 || Socorro || LINEAR || NYS || align=right | 1.0 km || 
|-id=514 bgcolor=#fefefe
| 213514 ||  || — || April 12, 2002 || Palomar || NEAT || NYS || align=right data-sort-value="0.97" | 970 m || 
|-id=515 bgcolor=#d6d6d6
| 213515 ||  || — || April 13, 2002 || Palomar || NEAT || 7:4 || align=right | 6.3 km || 
|-id=516 bgcolor=#fefefe
| 213516 ||  || — || April 13, 2002 || Kitt Peak || Spacewatch || NYS || align=right data-sort-value="0.66" | 660 m || 
|-id=517 bgcolor=#fefefe
| 213517 ||  || — || April 13, 2002 || Palomar || NEAT || NYS || align=right | 1.1 km || 
|-id=518 bgcolor=#fefefe
| 213518 ||  || — || April 13, 2002 || Palomar || NEAT || FLO || align=right data-sort-value="0.98" | 980 m || 
|-id=519 bgcolor=#fefefe
| 213519 ||  || — || April 14, 2002 || Palomar || NEAT || FLO || align=right | 1.0 km || 
|-id=520 bgcolor=#fefefe
| 213520 ||  || — || April 14, 2002 || Socorro || LINEAR || — || align=right data-sort-value="0.74" | 740 m || 
|-id=521 bgcolor=#fefefe
| 213521 ||  || — || April 13, 2002 || Palomar || NEAT || — || align=right | 1.2 km || 
|-id=522 bgcolor=#fefefe
| 213522 ||  || — || April 13, 2002 || Palomar || NEAT || V || align=right data-sort-value="0.85" | 850 m || 
|-id=523 bgcolor=#fefefe
| 213523 ||  || — || April 14, 2002 || Socorro || LINEAR || V || align=right data-sort-value="0.85" | 850 m || 
|-id=524 bgcolor=#fefefe
| 213524 ||  || — || April 15, 2002 || Anderson Mesa || LONEOS || V || align=right | 1.0 km || 
|-id=525 bgcolor=#fefefe
| 213525 ||  || — || April 12, 2002 || Socorro || LINEAR || — || align=right | 1.3 km || 
|-id=526 bgcolor=#fefefe
| 213526 ||  || — || April 16, 2002 || Socorro || LINEAR || — || align=right | 1.2 km || 
|-id=527 bgcolor=#fefefe
| 213527 ||  || — || April 29, 2002 || Palomar || NEAT || — || align=right | 1.2 km || 
|-id=528 bgcolor=#fefefe
| 213528 ||  || — || April 21, 2002 || Socorro || LINEAR || PHO || align=right | 1.3 km || 
|-id=529 bgcolor=#fefefe
| 213529 ||  || — || April 21, 2002 || Kitt Peak || Spacewatch || — || align=right | 1.1 km || 
|-id=530 bgcolor=#fefefe
| 213530 ||  || — || May 4, 2002 || Eskridge || Farpoint Obs. || V || align=right | 1.1 km || 
|-id=531 bgcolor=#fefefe
| 213531 ||  || — || May 7, 2002 || Palomar || NEAT || — || align=right | 2.1 km || 
|-id=532 bgcolor=#fefefe
| 213532 ||  || — || May 7, 2002 || Palomar || NEAT || FLO || align=right data-sort-value="0.85" | 850 m || 
|-id=533 bgcolor=#fefefe
| 213533 ||  || — || May 7, 2002 || Palomar || NEAT || — || align=right | 1.1 km || 
|-id=534 bgcolor=#fefefe
| 213534 ||  || — || May 9, 2002 || Socorro || LINEAR || — || align=right | 2.4 km || 
|-id=535 bgcolor=#fefefe
| 213535 ||  || — || May 9, 2002 || Socorro || LINEAR || NYS || align=right data-sort-value="0.82" | 820 m || 
|-id=536 bgcolor=#fefefe
| 213536 ||  || — || May 9, 2002 || Socorro || LINEAR || — || align=right | 1.1 km || 
|-id=537 bgcolor=#fefefe
| 213537 ||  || — || May 9, 2002 || Socorro || LINEAR || — || align=right | 1.2 km || 
|-id=538 bgcolor=#fefefe
| 213538 ||  || — || May 9, 2002 || Socorro || LINEAR || — || align=right | 1.2 km || 
|-id=539 bgcolor=#fefefe
| 213539 ||  || — || May 9, 2002 || Socorro || LINEAR || — || align=right | 1.3 km || 
|-id=540 bgcolor=#fefefe
| 213540 ||  || — || May 8, 2002 || Socorro || LINEAR || — || align=right | 2.0 km || 
|-id=541 bgcolor=#fefefe
| 213541 ||  || — || May 9, 2002 || Socorro || LINEAR || FLO || align=right data-sort-value="0.89" | 890 m || 
|-id=542 bgcolor=#fefefe
| 213542 ||  || — || May 11, 2002 || Socorro || LINEAR || FLO || align=right data-sort-value="0.86" | 860 m || 
|-id=543 bgcolor=#fefefe
| 213543 ||  || — || May 11, 2002 || Socorro || LINEAR || V || align=right | 1.4 km || 
|-id=544 bgcolor=#fefefe
| 213544 ||  || — || May 11, 2002 || Socorro || LINEAR || — || align=right data-sort-value="0.99" | 990 m || 
|-id=545 bgcolor=#fefefe
| 213545 ||  || — || May 11, 2002 || Socorro || LINEAR || FLO || align=right | 1.1 km || 
|-id=546 bgcolor=#fefefe
| 213546 ||  || — || May 11, 2002 || Socorro || LINEAR || FLO || align=right data-sort-value="0.94" | 940 m || 
|-id=547 bgcolor=#fefefe
| 213547 ||  || — || May 13, 2002 || Socorro || LINEAR || NYS || align=right data-sort-value="0.95" | 950 m || 
|-id=548 bgcolor=#FA8072
| 213548 ||  || — || May 7, 2002 || Anderson Mesa || LONEOS || — || align=right data-sort-value="0.89" | 890 m || 
|-id=549 bgcolor=#fefefe
| 213549 ||  || — || May 4, 2002 || Palomar || NEAT || — || align=right | 1.3 km || 
|-id=550 bgcolor=#fefefe
| 213550 ||  || — || May 7, 2002 || Palomar || NEAT || — || align=right | 2.6 km || 
|-id=551 bgcolor=#fefefe
| 213551 ||  || — || May 8, 2002 || Socorro || LINEAR || — || align=right | 1.6 km || 
|-id=552 bgcolor=#E9E9E9
| 213552 ||  || — || May 9, 2002 || Socorro || LINEAR || — || align=right | 4.0 km || 
|-id=553 bgcolor=#fefefe
| 213553 ||  || — || May 16, 2002 || Socorro || LINEAR || — || align=right | 1.1 km || 
|-id=554 bgcolor=#fefefe
| 213554 ||  || — || May 27, 2002 || Palomar || NEAT || — || align=right | 1.1 km || 
|-id=555 bgcolor=#fefefe
| 213555 ||  || — || June 2, 2002 || Palomar || NEAT || — || align=right | 1.2 km || 
|-id=556 bgcolor=#fefefe
| 213556 ||  || — || June 1, 2002 || Palomar || NEAT || — || align=right | 1.1 km || 
|-id=557 bgcolor=#fefefe
| 213557 ||  || — || June 2, 2002 || Palomar || NEAT || ERI || align=right | 1.8 km || 
|-id=558 bgcolor=#fefefe
| 213558 ||  || — || June 5, 2002 || Socorro || LINEAR || FLO || align=right data-sort-value="0.98" | 980 m || 
|-id=559 bgcolor=#fefefe
| 213559 ||  || — || June 7, 2002 || Socorro || LINEAR || — || align=right | 1.8 km || 
|-id=560 bgcolor=#fefefe
| 213560 ||  || — || June 9, 2002 || Socorro || LINEAR || — || align=right | 1.2 km || 
|-id=561 bgcolor=#fefefe
| 213561 ||  || — || June 9, 2002 || Haleakala || NEAT || — || align=right data-sort-value="0.90" | 900 m || 
|-id=562 bgcolor=#fefefe
| 213562 ||  || — || June 9, 2002 || Palomar || NEAT || — || align=right | 1.2 km || 
|-id=563 bgcolor=#fefefe
| 213563 ||  || — || June 10, 2002 || Socorro || LINEAR || — || align=right | 1.2 km || 
|-id=564 bgcolor=#fefefe
| 213564 ||  || — || June 10, 2002 || Socorro || LINEAR || — || align=right | 1.4 km || 
|-id=565 bgcolor=#fefefe
| 213565 ||  || — || June 7, 2002 || Kitt Peak || Spacewatch || V || align=right | 1.1 km || 
|-id=566 bgcolor=#fefefe
| 213566 ||  || — || June 9, 2002 || Socorro || LINEAR || V || align=right data-sort-value="0.91" | 910 m || 
|-id=567 bgcolor=#fefefe
| 213567 ||  || — || June 7, 2002 || Palomar || NEAT || — || align=right | 1.4 km || 
|-id=568 bgcolor=#E9E9E9
| 213568 ||  || — || June 14, 2002 || Socorro || LINEAR || — || align=right | 2.5 km || 
|-id=569 bgcolor=#fefefe
| 213569 ||  || — || June 16, 2002 || Palomar || NEAT || NYS || align=right data-sort-value="0.87" | 870 m || 
|-id=570 bgcolor=#fefefe
| 213570 ||  || — || July 4, 2002 || Palomar || NEAT || NYS || align=right data-sort-value="0.94" | 940 m || 
|-id=571 bgcolor=#fefefe
| 213571 ||  || — || July 10, 2002 || Campo Imperatore || CINEOS || NYS || align=right data-sort-value="0.74" | 740 m || 
|-id=572 bgcolor=#fefefe
| 213572 ||  || — || July 1, 2002 || Palomar || NEAT || — || align=right | 1.3 km || 
|-id=573 bgcolor=#fefefe
| 213573 ||  || — || July 5, 2002 || Socorro || LINEAR || NYS || align=right | 1.0 km || 
|-id=574 bgcolor=#fefefe
| 213574 ||  || — || July 9, 2002 || Socorro || LINEAR || — || align=right | 1.3 km || 
|-id=575 bgcolor=#fefefe
| 213575 ||  || — || July 9, 2002 || Socorro || LINEAR || — || align=right | 1.2 km || 
|-id=576 bgcolor=#E9E9E9
| 213576 ||  || — || July 9, 2002 || Socorro || LINEAR || — || align=right | 1.8 km || 
|-id=577 bgcolor=#fefefe
| 213577 ||  || — || July 10, 2002 || Palomar || NEAT || — || align=right | 1.0 km || 
|-id=578 bgcolor=#E9E9E9
| 213578 ||  || — || July 13, 2002 || Socorro || LINEAR || — || align=right | 3.5 km || 
|-id=579 bgcolor=#fefefe
| 213579 ||  || — || July 9, 2002 || Socorro || LINEAR || V || align=right | 1.0 km || 
|-id=580 bgcolor=#fefefe
| 213580 ||  || — || July 14, 2002 || Palomar || NEAT || — || align=right | 1.3 km || 
|-id=581 bgcolor=#fefefe
| 213581 ||  || — || July 13, 2002 || Palomar || NEAT || — || align=right | 1.2 km || 
|-id=582 bgcolor=#fefefe
| 213582 ||  || — || July 5, 2002 || Socorro || LINEAR || NYS || align=right data-sort-value="0.89" | 890 m || 
|-id=583 bgcolor=#E9E9E9
| 213583 ||  || — || July 9, 2002 || Socorro || LINEAR || — || align=right | 1.4 km || 
|-id=584 bgcolor=#fefefe
| 213584 ||  || — || July 9, 2002 || Socorro || LINEAR || — || align=right data-sort-value="0.90" | 900 m || 
|-id=585 bgcolor=#fefefe
| 213585 ||  || — || July 12, 2002 || Palomar || NEAT || — || align=right | 1.2 km || 
|-id=586 bgcolor=#fefefe
| 213586 ||  || — || July 15, 2002 || Palomar || NEAT || NYS || align=right data-sort-value="0.90" | 900 m || 
|-id=587 bgcolor=#fefefe
| 213587 ||  || — || July 2, 2002 || Palomar || NEAT || NYS || align=right data-sort-value="0.62" | 620 m || 
|-id=588 bgcolor=#E9E9E9
| 213588 ||  || — || July 17, 2002 || Palomar || NEAT || — || align=right | 1.4 km || 
|-id=589 bgcolor=#fefefe
| 213589 ||  || — || July 21, 2002 || Palomar || NEAT || — || align=right | 1.5 km || 
|-id=590 bgcolor=#E9E9E9
| 213590 ||  || — || July 18, 2002 || Socorro || LINEAR || — || align=right | 3.0 km || 
|-id=591 bgcolor=#E9E9E9
| 213591 ||  || — || July 30, 2002 || Haleakala || NEAT || MAR || align=right | 1.8 km || 
|-id=592 bgcolor=#fefefe
| 213592 ||  || — || July 22, 2002 || Palomar || NEAT || — || align=right | 1.5 km || 
|-id=593 bgcolor=#E9E9E9
| 213593 ||  || — || August 5, 2002 || Campo Imperatore || CINEOS || — || align=right | 2.2 km || 
|-id=594 bgcolor=#fefefe
| 213594 ||  || — || August 6, 2002 || Palomar || NEAT || — || align=right | 2.4 km || 
|-id=595 bgcolor=#fefefe
| 213595 ||  || — || August 6, 2002 || Palomar || NEAT || — || align=right | 1.2 km || 
|-id=596 bgcolor=#fefefe
| 213596 ||  || — || August 6, 2002 || Palomar || NEAT || NYS || align=right data-sort-value="0.95" | 950 m || 
|-id=597 bgcolor=#E9E9E9
| 213597 ||  || — || August 4, 2002 || Socorro || LINEAR || — || align=right | 3.3 km || 
|-id=598 bgcolor=#fefefe
| 213598 ||  || — || August 10, 2002 || Socorro || LINEAR || V || align=right | 1.2 km || 
|-id=599 bgcolor=#E9E9E9
| 213599 ||  || — || August 8, 2002 || Palomar || NEAT || — || align=right | 1.6 km || 
|-id=600 bgcolor=#E9E9E9
| 213600 ||  || — || August 8, 2002 || Palomar || NEAT || — || align=right | 1.6 km || 
|}

213601–213700 

|-bgcolor=#fefefe
| 213601 ||  || — || August 9, 2002 || Socorro || LINEAR || — || align=right | 1.3 km || 
|-id=602 bgcolor=#E9E9E9
| 213602 ||  || — || August 8, 2002 || Palomar || NEAT || — || align=right | 2.4 km || 
|-id=603 bgcolor=#fefefe
| 213603 ||  || — || August 12, 2002 || Socorro || LINEAR || — || align=right | 1.6 km || 
|-id=604 bgcolor=#fefefe
| 213604 ||  || — || August 13, 2002 || Reedy Creek || J. Broughton || ERI || align=right | 2.6 km || 
|-id=605 bgcolor=#fefefe
| 213605 ||  || — || August 12, 2002 || Haleakala || NEAT || NYS || align=right | 1.2 km || 
|-id=606 bgcolor=#d6d6d6
| 213606 ||  || — || August 12, 2002 || Socorro || LINEAR || — || align=right | 4.2 km || 
|-id=607 bgcolor=#E9E9E9
| 213607 ||  || — || August 12, 2002 || Socorro || LINEAR || ADE || align=right | 4.5 km || 
|-id=608 bgcolor=#fefefe
| 213608 ||  || — || August 13, 2002 || Anderson Mesa || LONEOS || — || align=right | 1.2 km || 
|-id=609 bgcolor=#E9E9E9
| 213609 ||  || — || August 13, 2002 || Anderson Mesa || LONEOS || MAR || align=right | 1.5 km || 
|-id=610 bgcolor=#fefefe
| 213610 ||  || — || August 13, 2002 || Anderson Mesa || LONEOS || — || align=right | 1.1 km || 
|-id=611 bgcolor=#fefefe
| 213611 ||  || — || August 8, 2002 || Palomar || S. F. Hönig || MAS || align=right data-sort-value="0.85" | 850 m || 
|-id=612 bgcolor=#E9E9E9
| 213612 ||  || — || August 8, 2002 || Palomar || NEAT || — || align=right | 1.0 km || 
|-id=613 bgcolor=#fefefe
| 213613 ||  || — || August 8, 2002 || Palomar || NEAT || V || align=right | 1.1 km || 
|-id=614 bgcolor=#fefefe
| 213614 ||  || — || August 7, 2002 || Palomar || NEAT || V || align=right | 1.0 km || 
|-id=615 bgcolor=#fefefe
| 213615 ||  || — || August 13, 2002 || Palomar || NEAT || V || align=right | 1.1 km || 
|-id=616 bgcolor=#E9E9E9
| 213616 ||  || — || August 8, 2002 || Palomar || NEAT || — || align=right | 1.5 km || 
|-id=617 bgcolor=#fefefe
| 213617 ||  || — || August 26, 2002 || Palomar || NEAT || — || align=right | 1.1 km || 
|-id=618 bgcolor=#E9E9E9
| 213618 ||  || — || August 27, 2002 || Palomar || NEAT || — || align=right | 1.9 km || 
|-id=619 bgcolor=#E9E9E9
| 213619 ||  || — || August 27, 2002 || Palomar || NEAT || — || align=right | 1.7 km || 
|-id=620 bgcolor=#fefefe
| 213620 ||  || — || August 28, 2002 || Palomar || NEAT || — || align=right | 1.2 km || 
|-id=621 bgcolor=#fefefe
| 213621 ||  || — || August 19, 2002 || Palomar || S. F. Hönig || — || align=right | 2.8 km || 
|-id=622 bgcolor=#E9E9E9
| 213622 ||  || — || August 29, 2002 || Palomar || S. F. Hönig || — || align=right | 1.3 km || 
|-id=623 bgcolor=#E9E9E9
| 213623 ||  || — || August 17, 2002 || Palomar || A. Lowe || — || align=right data-sort-value="0.98" | 980 m || 
|-id=624 bgcolor=#fefefe
| 213624 ||  || — || August 28, 2002 || Palomar || A. Lowe || MAS || align=right data-sort-value="0.89" | 890 m || 
|-id=625 bgcolor=#fefefe
| 213625 ||  || — || August 29, 2002 || Palomar || S. F. Hönig || NYS || align=right data-sort-value="0.83" | 830 m || 
|-id=626 bgcolor=#fefefe
| 213626 ||  || — || August 16, 2002 || Palomar || NEAT || — || align=right data-sort-value="0.91" | 910 m || 
|-id=627 bgcolor=#fefefe
| 213627 ||  || — || August 28, 2002 || Palomar || NEAT || — || align=right data-sort-value="0.94" | 940 m || 
|-id=628 bgcolor=#fefefe
| 213628 ||  || — || August 28, 2002 || Palomar || NEAT || V || align=right | 1.0 km || 
|-id=629 bgcolor=#E9E9E9
| 213629 Binford ||  ||  || August 26, 2002 || Palomar || NEAT || — || align=right data-sort-value="0.93" | 930 m || 
|-id=630 bgcolor=#fefefe
| 213630 ||  || — || August 30, 2002 || Palomar || NEAT || — || align=right | 1.1 km || 
|-id=631 bgcolor=#fefefe
| 213631 ||  || — || August 29, 2002 || Palomar || NEAT || — || align=right | 1.0 km || 
|-id=632 bgcolor=#d6d6d6
| 213632 ||  || — || August 19, 2002 || Palomar || NEAT || — || align=right | 4.6 km || 
|-id=633 bgcolor=#E9E9E9
| 213633 ||  || — || August 27, 2002 || Palomar || NEAT || — || align=right | 1.9 km || 
|-id=634 bgcolor=#fefefe
| 213634 ||  || — || August 29, 2002 || Palomar || NEAT || MAS || align=right data-sort-value="0.91" | 910 m || 
|-id=635 bgcolor=#fefefe
| 213635 ||  || — || August 30, 2002 || Palomar || NEAT || NYS || align=right data-sort-value="0.92" | 920 m || 
|-id=636 bgcolor=#E9E9E9
| 213636 Gajdoš ||  ||  || August 20, 2002 || Palomar || NEAT || — || align=right | 2.2 km || 
|-id=637 bgcolor=#E9E9E9
| 213637 Lemarchal ||  ||  || August 17, 2002 || Palomar || NEAT || — || align=right | 1.9 km || 
|-id=638 bgcolor=#E9E9E9
| 213638 ||  || — || September 4, 2002 || Anderson Mesa || LONEOS || — || align=right | 1.2 km || 
|-id=639 bgcolor=#fefefe
| 213639 ||  || — || September 5, 2002 || Socorro || LINEAR || — || align=right | 1.2 km || 
|-id=640 bgcolor=#FA8072
| 213640 ||  || — || September 5, 2002 || Socorro || LINEAR || — || align=right | 1.5 km || 
|-id=641 bgcolor=#d6d6d6
| 213641 ||  || — || September 3, 2002 || Palomar || NEAT || EOS || align=right | 3.3 km || 
|-id=642 bgcolor=#E9E9E9
| 213642 ||  || — || September 5, 2002 || Socorro || LINEAR || — || align=right | 1.4 km || 
|-id=643 bgcolor=#E9E9E9
| 213643 ||  || — || September 5, 2002 || Socorro || LINEAR || — || align=right | 2.6 km || 
|-id=644 bgcolor=#E9E9E9
| 213644 ||  || — || September 5, 2002 || Socorro || LINEAR || — || align=right | 1.8 km || 
|-id=645 bgcolor=#E9E9E9
| 213645 ||  || — || September 5, 2002 || Socorro || LINEAR || — || align=right | 1.5 km || 
|-id=646 bgcolor=#E9E9E9
| 213646 ||  || — || September 6, 2002 || Socorro || LINEAR || MAR || align=right | 1.5 km || 
|-id=647 bgcolor=#E9E9E9
| 213647 ||  || — || September 7, 2002 || Kleť || Kleť Obs. || ADE || align=right | 3.4 km || 
|-id=648 bgcolor=#fefefe
| 213648 ||  || — || September 9, 2002 || Palomar || NEAT || ERI || align=right | 2.0 km || 
|-id=649 bgcolor=#E9E9E9
| 213649 ||  || — || September 10, 2002 || Palomar || NEAT || HNS || align=right | 2.1 km || 
|-id=650 bgcolor=#fefefe
| 213650 ||  || — || September 10, 2002 || Haleakala || NEAT || — || align=right | 2.2 km || 
|-id=651 bgcolor=#E9E9E9
| 213651 ||  || — || September 11, 2002 || Palomar || NEAT || — || align=right | 2.2 km || 
|-id=652 bgcolor=#E9E9E9
| 213652 ||  || — || September 12, 2002 || Palomar || NEAT || — || align=right | 4.3 km || 
|-id=653 bgcolor=#fefefe
| 213653 ||  || — || September 13, 2002 || Palomar || NEAT || — || align=right data-sort-value="0.99" | 990 m || 
|-id=654 bgcolor=#E9E9E9
| 213654 ||  || — || September 14, 2002 || Palomar || NEAT || GEF || align=right | 1.4 km || 
|-id=655 bgcolor=#E9E9E9
| 213655 ||  || — || September 13, 2002 || Socorro || LINEAR || — || align=right | 1.4 km || 
|-id=656 bgcolor=#fefefe
| 213656 ||  || — || September 14, 2002 || Palomar || R. Matson || NYS || align=right data-sort-value="0.78" | 780 m || 
|-id=657 bgcolor=#fefefe
| 213657 ||  || — || September 12, 2002 || Palomar || NEAT || — || align=right | 1.1 km || 
|-id=658 bgcolor=#E9E9E9
| 213658 ||  || — || September 14, 2002 || Palomar || NEAT || MAR || align=right | 1.4 km || 
|-id=659 bgcolor=#fefefe
| 213659 ||  || — || September 13, 2002 || Haleakala || NEAT || NYS || align=right | 1.1 km || 
|-id=660 bgcolor=#E9E9E9
| 213660 ||  || — || September 27, 2002 || Palomar || NEAT || — || align=right | 3.5 km || 
|-id=661 bgcolor=#fefefe
| 213661 ||  || — || September 27, 2002 || Palomar || NEAT || H || align=right data-sort-value="0.91" | 910 m || 
|-id=662 bgcolor=#E9E9E9
| 213662 ||  || — || September 27, 2002 || Palomar || NEAT || MAR || align=right | 1.5 km || 
|-id=663 bgcolor=#E9E9E9
| 213663 ||  || — || September 29, 2002 || Haleakala || NEAT || — || align=right | 3.4 km || 
|-id=664 bgcolor=#fefefe
| 213664 ||  || — || September 30, 2002 || Socorro || LINEAR || — || align=right | 1.2 km || 
|-id=665 bgcolor=#E9E9E9
| 213665 ||  || — || September 30, 2002 || Haleakala || NEAT || DOR || align=right | 3.6 km || 
|-id=666 bgcolor=#d6d6d6
| 213666 ||  || — || September 16, 2002 || Palomar || NEAT || — || align=right | 5.8 km || 
|-id=667 bgcolor=#E9E9E9
| 213667 ||  || — || October 1, 2002 || Anderson Mesa || LONEOS || — || align=right | 2.0 km || 
|-id=668 bgcolor=#E9E9E9
| 213668 ||  || — || October 2, 2002 || Socorro || LINEAR || — || align=right | 2.0 km || 
|-id=669 bgcolor=#E9E9E9
| 213669 ||  || — || October 2, 2002 || Socorro || LINEAR || HNS || align=right | 2.1 km || 
|-id=670 bgcolor=#E9E9E9
| 213670 ||  || — || October 2, 2002 || Socorro || LINEAR || — || align=right | 2.3 km || 
|-id=671 bgcolor=#fefefe
| 213671 ||  || — || October 2, 2002 || Socorro || LINEAR || H || align=right | 1.3 km || 
|-id=672 bgcolor=#E9E9E9
| 213672 ||  || — || October 2, 2002 || Socorro || LINEAR || — || align=right | 2.1 km || 
|-id=673 bgcolor=#E9E9E9
| 213673 ||  || — || October 2, 2002 || Socorro || LINEAR || ADE || align=right | 3.4 km || 
|-id=674 bgcolor=#E9E9E9
| 213674 ||  || — || October 2, 2002 || Needville || Needville Obs. || — || align=right | 3.4 km || 
|-id=675 bgcolor=#fefefe
| 213675 ||  || — || October 5, 2002 || Socorro || LINEAR || H || align=right data-sort-value="0.82" | 820 m || 
|-id=676 bgcolor=#E9E9E9
| 213676 ||  || — || October 4, 2002 || Campo Imperatore || CINEOS || — || align=right | 2.0 km || 
|-id=677 bgcolor=#fefefe
| 213677 ||  || — || October 6, 2002 || Palomar || NEAT || H || align=right data-sort-value="0.87" | 870 m || 
|-id=678 bgcolor=#E9E9E9
| 213678 ||  || — || October 1, 2002 || Socorro || LINEAR || MRX || align=right | 1.8 km || 
|-id=679 bgcolor=#E9E9E9
| 213679 ||  || — || October 3, 2002 || Socorro || LINEAR || — || align=right | 2.9 km || 
|-id=680 bgcolor=#E9E9E9
| 213680 ||  || — || October 3, 2002 || Socorro || LINEAR || — || align=right | 1.7 km || 
|-id=681 bgcolor=#E9E9E9
| 213681 ||  || — || October 2, 2002 || Socorro || LINEAR || HOF || align=right | 4.0 km || 
|-id=682 bgcolor=#fefefe
| 213682 ||  || — || October 3, 2002 || Socorro || LINEAR || — || align=right | 1.2 km || 
|-id=683 bgcolor=#E9E9E9
| 213683 ||  || — || October 3, 2002 || Socorro || LINEAR || — || align=right | 3.1 km || 
|-id=684 bgcolor=#E9E9E9
| 213684 ||  || — || October 3, 2002 || Socorro || LINEAR || — || align=right | 1.2 km || 
|-id=685 bgcolor=#fefefe
| 213685 ||  || — || October 14, 2002 || Socorro || LINEAR || H || align=right | 1.0 km || 
|-id=686 bgcolor=#E9E9E9
| 213686 ||  || — || October 6, 2002 || Haleakala || NEAT || — || align=right | 3.5 km || 
|-id=687 bgcolor=#E9E9E9
| 213687 ||  || — || October 7, 2002 || Socorro || LINEAR || — || align=right | 1.4 km || 
|-id=688 bgcolor=#fefefe
| 213688 ||  || — || October 7, 2002 || Socorro || LINEAR || H || align=right | 1.1 km || 
|-id=689 bgcolor=#E9E9E9
| 213689 ||  || — || October 8, 2002 || Anderson Mesa || LONEOS || GER || align=right | 2.4 km || 
|-id=690 bgcolor=#E9E9E9
| 213690 ||  || — || October 7, 2002 || Haleakala || NEAT || — || align=right | 4.7 km || 
|-id=691 bgcolor=#E9E9E9
| 213691 ||  || — || October 8, 2002 || Palomar || NEAT || — || align=right | 1.5 km || 
|-id=692 bgcolor=#E9E9E9
| 213692 ||  || — || October 9, 2002 || Anderson Mesa || LONEOS || — || align=right | 1.2 km || 
|-id=693 bgcolor=#E9E9E9
| 213693 ||  || — || October 7, 2002 || Socorro || LINEAR || AST || align=right | 2.5 km || 
|-id=694 bgcolor=#E9E9E9
| 213694 ||  || — || October 9, 2002 || Socorro || LINEAR || — || align=right | 3.2 km || 
|-id=695 bgcolor=#E9E9E9
| 213695 ||  || — || October 9, 2002 || Socorro || LINEAR || — || align=right | 2.8 km || 
|-id=696 bgcolor=#E9E9E9
| 213696 ||  || — || October 10, 2002 || Socorro || LINEAR || BRU || align=right | 6.1 km || 
|-id=697 bgcolor=#E9E9E9
| 213697 ||  || — || October 9, 2002 || Socorro || LINEAR || — || align=right | 3.8 km || 
|-id=698 bgcolor=#E9E9E9
| 213698 ||  || — || October 9, 2002 || Socorro || LINEAR || — || align=right | 3.6 km || 
|-id=699 bgcolor=#d6d6d6
| 213699 ||  || — || October 10, 2002 || Socorro || LINEAR || EUP || align=right | 6.6 km || 
|-id=700 bgcolor=#fefefe
| 213700 ||  || — || October 10, 2002 || Socorro || LINEAR || H || align=right | 1.1 km || 
|}

213701–213800 

|-bgcolor=#E9E9E9
| 213701 ||  || — || October 10, 2002 || Socorro || LINEAR || — || align=right | 2.7 km || 
|-id=702 bgcolor=#E9E9E9
| 213702 ||  || — || October 11, 2002 || Socorro || LINEAR || — || align=right | 3.4 km || 
|-id=703 bgcolor=#E9E9E9
| 213703 ||  || — || October 10, 2002 || Apache Point || SDSS || — || align=right | 1.8 km || 
|-id=704 bgcolor=#E9E9E9
| 213704 ||  || — || October 10, 2002 || Apache Point || SDSS || — || align=right | 1.3 km || 
|-id=705 bgcolor=#E9E9E9
| 213705 ||  || — || October 4, 2002 || Palomar || NEAT || — || align=right | 1.2 km || 
|-id=706 bgcolor=#E9E9E9
| 213706 ||  || — || October 25, 2002 || Palomar || NEAT || — || align=right | 2.1 km || 
|-id=707 bgcolor=#E9E9E9
| 213707 ||  || — || October 28, 2002 || Haleakala || NEAT || — || align=right | 1.3 km || 
|-id=708 bgcolor=#E9E9E9
| 213708 ||  || — || October 30, 2002 || Kitt Peak || Spacewatch || — || align=right | 3.2 km || 
|-id=709 bgcolor=#E9E9E9
| 213709 ||  || — || October 31, 2002 || Palomar || NEAT || RAF || align=right | 1.3 km || 
|-id=710 bgcolor=#E9E9E9
| 213710 ||  || — || October 31, 2002 || Anderson Mesa || LONEOS || DOR || align=right | 3.4 km || 
|-id=711 bgcolor=#E9E9E9
| 213711 ||  || — || October 31, 2002 || Palomar || NEAT || KON || align=right | 3.1 km || 
|-id=712 bgcolor=#E9E9E9
| 213712 ||  || — || October 30, 2002 || Apache Point || SDSS || — || align=right | 1.7 km || 
|-id=713 bgcolor=#E9E9E9
| 213713 ||  || — || October 30, 2002 || Apache Point || SDSS || RAF || align=right | 1.2 km || 
|-id=714 bgcolor=#d6d6d6
| 213714 ||  || — || November 1, 2002 || Palomar || NEAT || — || align=right | 3.8 km || 
|-id=715 bgcolor=#fefefe
| 213715 ||  || — || November 5, 2002 || Socorro || LINEAR || H || align=right | 1.0 km || 
|-id=716 bgcolor=#fefefe
| 213716 ||  || — || November 6, 2002 || Socorro || LINEAR || H || align=right data-sort-value="0.76" | 760 m || 
|-id=717 bgcolor=#d6d6d6
| 213717 ||  || — || November 4, 2002 || Palomar || NEAT || EOS || align=right | 2.9 km || 
|-id=718 bgcolor=#E9E9E9
| 213718 ||  || — || November 5, 2002 || Socorro || LINEAR || — || align=right | 2.8 km || 
|-id=719 bgcolor=#E9E9E9
| 213719 ||  || — || November 5, 2002 || Palomar || NEAT || HEN || align=right | 1.4 km || 
|-id=720 bgcolor=#E9E9E9
| 213720 ||  || — || November 5, 2002 || Socorro || LINEAR || — || align=right | 1.8 km || 
|-id=721 bgcolor=#E9E9E9
| 213721 ||  || — || November 6, 2002 || Anderson Mesa || LONEOS || — || align=right | 3.3 km || 
|-id=722 bgcolor=#E9E9E9
| 213722 ||  || — || November 6, 2002 || Socorro || LINEAR || — || align=right | 3.4 km || 
|-id=723 bgcolor=#E9E9E9
| 213723 ||  || — || November 6, 2002 || Anderson Mesa || LONEOS || — || align=right | 4.2 km || 
|-id=724 bgcolor=#E9E9E9
| 213724 ||  || — || November 6, 2002 || Anderson Mesa || LONEOS || — || align=right | 4.3 km || 
|-id=725 bgcolor=#E9E9E9
| 213725 ||  || — || November 7, 2002 || Socorro || LINEAR || HOF || align=right | 3.6 km || 
|-id=726 bgcolor=#E9E9E9
| 213726 ||  || — || November 7, 2002 || Socorro || LINEAR || GEF || align=right | 1.6 km || 
|-id=727 bgcolor=#E9E9E9
| 213727 ||  || — || November 13, 2002 || Wrightwood || J. W. Young || — || align=right | 2.9 km || 
|-id=728 bgcolor=#E9E9E9
| 213728 ||  || — || November 11, 2002 || Socorro || LINEAR || RAF || align=right | 1.8 km || 
|-id=729 bgcolor=#fefefe
| 213729 ||  || — || November 12, 2002 || Socorro || LINEAR || H || align=right data-sort-value="0.86" | 860 m || 
|-id=730 bgcolor=#E9E9E9
| 213730 ||  || — || November 14, 2002 || Socorro || LINEAR || AGN || align=right | 1.5 km || 
|-id=731 bgcolor=#E9E9E9
| 213731 ||  || — || November 11, 2002 || Socorro || LINEAR || — || align=right | 3.4 km || 
|-id=732 bgcolor=#d6d6d6
| 213732 ||  || — || November 14, 2002 || Socorro || LINEAR || — || align=right | 6.0 km || 
|-id=733 bgcolor=#d6d6d6
| 213733 ||  || — || November 7, 2002 || Kitt Peak || Spacewatch || — || align=right | 3.3 km || 
|-id=734 bgcolor=#d6d6d6
| 213734 ||  || — || November 8, 2002 || Socorro || LINEAR || — || align=right | 6.0 km || 
|-id=735 bgcolor=#E9E9E9
| 213735 ||  || — || November 5, 2002 || Palomar || NEAT || — || align=right | 2.5 km || 
|-id=736 bgcolor=#E9E9E9
| 213736 ||  || — || November 4, 2002 || Palomar || NEAT || AST || align=right | 2.0 km || 
|-id=737 bgcolor=#E9E9E9
| 213737 ||  || — || November 23, 2002 || Palomar || NEAT || — || align=right | 1.4 km || 
|-id=738 bgcolor=#E9E9E9
| 213738 ||  || — || November 24, 2002 || Palomar || NEAT || — || align=right | 2.3 km || 
|-id=739 bgcolor=#d6d6d6
| 213739 ||  || — || November 24, 2002 || Palomar || NEAT || CHA || align=right | 3.5 km || 
|-id=740 bgcolor=#E9E9E9
| 213740 ||  || — || November 16, 2002 || Palomar || NEAT || — || align=right | 2.3 km || 
|-id=741 bgcolor=#E9E9E9
| 213741 ||  || — || November 22, 2002 || Palomar || NEAT || — || align=right | 3.1 km || 
|-id=742 bgcolor=#E9E9E9
| 213742 ||  || — || November 24, 2002 || Palomar || NEAT || HOF || align=right | 5.4 km || 
|-id=743 bgcolor=#d6d6d6
| 213743 ||  || — || December 1, 2002 || Socorro || LINEAR || — || align=right | 3.8 km || 
|-id=744 bgcolor=#E9E9E9
| 213744 ||  || — || December 3, 2002 || Palomar || NEAT || — || align=right | 3.7 km || 
|-id=745 bgcolor=#FA8072
| 213745 ||  || — || December 10, 2002 || Socorro || LINEAR || H || align=right | 1.2 km || 
|-id=746 bgcolor=#E9E9E9
| 213746 ||  || — || December 10, 2002 || Socorro || LINEAR || — || align=right | 2.9 km || 
|-id=747 bgcolor=#E9E9E9
| 213747 ||  || — || December 10, 2002 || Socorro || LINEAR || — || align=right | 3.7 km || 
|-id=748 bgcolor=#E9E9E9
| 213748 ||  || — || December 10, 2002 || Palomar || NEAT || — || align=right | 2.2 km || 
|-id=749 bgcolor=#E9E9E9
| 213749 ||  || — || December 11, 2002 || Socorro || LINEAR || — || align=right | 5.7 km || 
|-id=750 bgcolor=#d6d6d6
| 213750 ||  || — || December 12, 2002 || Socorro || LINEAR || EUP || align=right | 7.8 km || 
|-id=751 bgcolor=#E9E9E9
| 213751 ||  || — || December 11, 2002 || Desert Eagle || W. K. Y. Yeung || — || align=right | 1.9 km || 
|-id=752 bgcolor=#d6d6d6
| 213752 ||  || — || December 11, 2002 || Socorro || LINEAR || — || align=right | 4.5 km || 
|-id=753 bgcolor=#d6d6d6
| 213753 ||  || — || December 11, 2002 || Apache Point || SDSS || — || align=right | 4.3 km || 
|-id=754 bgcolor=#E9E9E9
| 213754 ||  || — || December 31, 2002 || Socorro || LINEAR || — || align=right | 3.8 km || 
|-id=755 bgcolor=#fefefe
| 213755 ||  || — || January 1, 2003 || Socorro || LINEAR || H || align=right | 1.0 km || 
|-id=756 bgcolor=#d6d6d6
| 213756 ||  || — || January 4, 2003 || Socorro || LINEAR || — || align=right | 3.9 km || 
|-id=757 bgcolor=#d6d6d6
| 213757 ||  || — || January 5, 2003 || Socorro || LINEAR || URS || align=right | 6.7 km || 
|-id=758 bgcolor=#d6d6d6
| 213758 ||  || — || January 5, 2003 || Socorro || LINEAR || — || align=right | 3.8 km || 
|-id=759 bgcolor=#E9E9E9
| 213759 ||  || — || January 5, 2003 || Socorro || LINEAR || JUN || align=right | 2.8 km || 
|-id=760 bgcolor=#E9E9E9
| 213760 ||  || — || January 7, 2003 || Socorro || LINEAR || CLO || align=right | 3.8 km || 
|-id=761 bgcolor=#E9E9E9
| 213761 ||  || — || January 7, 2003 || Socorro || LINEAR || — || align=right | 4.7 km || 
|-id=762 bgcolor=#d6d6d6
| 213762 ||  || — || January 7, 2003 || Socorro || LINEAR || — || align=right | 4.5 km || 
|-id=763 bgcolor=#d6d6d6
| 213763 ||  || — || January 11, 2003 || Socorro || LINEAR || — || align=right | 6.8 km || 
|-id=764 bgcolor=#d6d6d6
| 213764 ||  || — || January 11, 2003 || Socorro || LINEAR || — || align=right | 5.0 km || 
|-id=765 bgcolor=#d6d6d6
| 213765 ||  || — || January 25, 2003 || Palomar || NEAT || — || align=right | 6.6 km || 
|-id=766 bgcolor=#d6d6d6
| 213766 ||  || — || January 27, 2003 || Anderson Mesa || LONEOS || — || align=right | 5.1 km || 
|-id=767 bgcolor=#d6d6d6
| 213767 ||  || — || February 8, 2003 || Socorro || LINEAR || — || align=right | 4.6 km || 
|-id=768 bgcolor=#d6d6d6
| 213768 ||  || — || February 9, 2003 || Palomar || NEAT || HYG || align=right | 3.8 km || 
|-id=769 bgcolor=#d6d6d6
| 213769 ||  || — || February 11, 2003 || Haleakala || NEAT || — || align=right | 4.4 km || 
|-id=770 bgcolor=#d6d6d6
| 213770 Fignon ||  ||  || February 23, 2003 || Vicques || M. Ory || — || align=right | 3.4 km || 
|-id=771 bgcolor=#d6d6d6
| 213771 Johndee ||  ||  || February 27, 2003 || Kleť || KLENOT || THM || align=right | 3.1 km || 
|-id=772 bgcolor=#d6d6d6
| 213772 Blaheta ||  ||  || February 27, 2003 || Kleť || KLENOT || HYG || align=right | 4.2 km || 
|-id=773 bgcolor=#d6d6d6
| 213773 ||  || — || February 22, 2003 || Goodricke-Pigott || J. W. Kessel || — || align=right | 5.5 km || 
|-id=774 bgcolor=#d6d6d6
| 213774 ||  || — || February 26, 2003 || Socorro || LINEAR || — || align=right | 6.7 km || 
|-id=775 bgcolor=#d6d6d6
| 213775 Zdeněkdostál ||  ||  || February 28, 2003 || Kleť || KLENOT || — || align=right | 4.3 km || 
|-id=776 bgcolor=#d6d6d6
| 213776 ||  || — || February 21, 2003 || Palomar || NEAT || — || align=right | 5.1 km || 
|-id=777 bgcolor=#d6d6d6
| 213777 ||  || — || March 6, 2003 || Socorro || LINEAR || HYG || align=right | 6.4 km || 
|-id=778 bgcolor=#d6d6d6
| 213778 ||  || — || March 6, 2003 || Anderson Mesa || LONEOS || — || align=right | 4.5 km || 
|-id=779 bgcolor=#d6d6d6
| 213779 ||  || — || March 6, 2003 || Anderson Mesa || LONEOS || — || align=right | 4.4 km || 
|-id=780 bgcolor=#d6d6d6
| 213780 ||  || — || March 8, 2003 || Anderson Mesa || LONEOS || — || align=right | 5.2 km || 
|-id=781 bgcolor=#d6d6d6
| 213781 ||  || — || March 11, 2003 || Palomar || NEAT || TIR || align=right | 4.9 km || 
|-id=782 bgcolor=#d6d6d6
| 213782 ||  || — || March 13, 2003 || Socorro || LINEAR || — || align=right | 5.3 km || 
|-id=783 bgcolor=#d6d6d6
| 213783 ||  || — || March 22, 2003 || Desert Moon || B. L. Stevens || HYG || align=right | 3.1 km || 
|-id=784 bgcolor=#d6d6d6
| 213784 ||  || — || March 25, 2003 || Kleť || M. Tichý || — || align=right | 5.3 km || 
|-id=785 bgcolor=#d6d6d6
| 213785 ||  || — || March 25, 2003 || Emerald Lane || L. Ball || MEL || align=right | 4.8 km || 
|-id=786 bgcolor=#d6d6d6
| 213786 ||  || — || March 26, 2003 || Campo Imperatore || CINEOS || — || align=right | 5.6 km || 
|-id=787 bgcolor=#d6d6d6
| 213787 ||  || — || March 23, 2003 || Kitt Peak || Spacewatch || — || align=right | 5.9 km || 
|-id=788 bgcolor=#d6d6d6
| 213788 ||  || — || March 23, 2003 || Kitt Peak || Spacewatch || — || align=right | 2.5 km || 
|-id=789 bgcolor=#d6d6d6
| 213789 ||  || — || March 24, 2003 || Kitt Peak || Spacewatch || — || align=right | 4.1 km || 
|-id=790 bgcolor=#d6d6d6
| 213790 ||  || — || March 23, 2003 || Kitt Peak || Spacewatch || — || align=right | 4.7 km || 
|-id=791 bgcolor=#d6d6d6
| 213791 ||  || — || March 23, 2003 || Kitt Peak || Spacewatch || HYG || align=right | 3.3 km || 
|-id=792 bgcolor=#d6d6d6
| 213792 ||  || — || March 30, 2003 || Socorro || LINEAR || ALA || align=right | 9.0 km || 
|-id=793 bgcolor=#d6d6d6
| 213793 ||  || — || March 23, 2003 || Kitt Peak || Spacewatch || HYG || align=right | 6.4 km || 
|-id=794 bgcolor=#d6d6d6
| 213794 ||  || — || March 25, 2003 || Catalina || CSS || — || align=right | 4.9 km || 
|-id=795 bgcolor=#d6d6d6
| 213795 ||  || — || March 26, 2003 || Kitt Peak || Spacewatch || — || align=right | 5.4 km || 
|-id=796 bgcolor=#d6d6d6
| 213796 ||  || — || March 29, 2003 || Anderson Mesa || LONEOS || LIX || align=right | 5.4 km || 
|-id=797 bgcolor=#d6d6d6
| 213797 ||  || — || March 30, 2003 || Anderson Mesa || LONEOS || EOS || align=right | 3.5 km || 
|-id=798 bgcolor=#d6d6d6
| 213798 ||  || — || March 31, 2003 || Anderson Mesa || LONEOS || HYG || align=right | 5.7 km || 
|-id=799 bgcolor=#d6d6d6
| 213799 ||  || — || March 23, 2003 || Kitt Peak || Spacewatch || — || align=right | 3.8 km || 
|-id=800 bgcolor=#d6d6d6
| 213800 Stefanwul ||  ||  || April 2, 2003 || Saint-Sulpice || B. Christophe || — || align=right | 4.6 km || 
|}

213801–213900 

|-bgcolor=#d6d6d6
| 213801 ||  || — || April 3, 2003 || Anderson Mesa || LONEOS || — || align=right | 5.9 km || 
|-id=802 bgcolor=#d6d6d6
| 213802 ||  || — || April 2, 2003 || Haleakala || NEAT || — || align=right | 5.6 km || 
|-id=803 bgcolor=#d6d6d6
| 213803 ||  || — || April 5, 2003 || Haleakala || NEAT || — || align=right | 6.1 km || 
|-id=804 bgcolor=#d6d6d6
| 213804 ||  || — || April 5, 2003 || Haleakala || NEAT || EUP || align=right | 7.8 km || 
|-id=805 bgcolor=#d6d6d6
| 213805 ||  || — || April 5, 2003 || Anderson Mesa || LONEOS || EUP || align=right | 7.4 km || 
|-id=806 bgcolor=#d6d6d6
| 213806 ||  || — || April 5, 2003 || Anderson Mesa || LONEOS || — || align=right | 4.0 km || 
|-id=807 bgcolor=#d6d6d6
| 213807 ||  || — || April 7, 2003 || Palomar || NEAT || — || align=right | 4.4 km || 
|-id=808 bgcolor=#fefefe
| 213808 ||  || — || April 25, 2003 || Kitt Peak || Spacewatch || — || align=right | 1.0 km || 
|-id=809 bgcolor=#d6d6d6
| 213809 ||  || — || April 26, 2003 || Haleakala || NEAT || — || align=right | 5.0 km || 
|-id=810 bgcolor=#d6d6d6
| 213810 ||  || — || April 27, 2003 || Anderson Mesa || LONEOS || — || align=right | 5.2 km || 
|-id=811 bgcolor=#fefefe
| 213811 ||  || — || June 26, 2003 || Socorro || LINEAR || FLO || align=right | 1.9 km || 
|-id=812 bgcolor=#FA8072
| 213812 ||  || — || July 1, 2003 || Haleakala || NEAT || — || align=right | 1.2 km || 
|-id=813 bgcolor=#fefefe
| 213813 ||  || — || August 4, 2003 || Socorro || LINEAR || NYS || align=right | 1.0 km || 
|-id=814 bgcolor=#fefefe
| 213814 ||  || — || August 22, 2003 || Socorro || LINEAR || NYS || align=right data-sort-value="0.91" | 910 m || 
|-id=815 bgcolor=#fefefe
| 213815 ||  || — || August 22, 2003 || Palomar || NEAT || — || align=right | 1.5 km || 
|-id=816 bgcolor=#fefefe
| 213816 ||  || — || August 22, 2003 || Palomar || NEAT || — || align=right | 1.5 km || 
|-id=817 bgcolor=#fefefe
| 213817 ||  || — || August 21, 2003 || Palomar || NEAT || — || align=right | 1.2 km || 
|-id=818 bgcolor=#fefefe
| 213818 ||  || — || August 22, 2003 || Haleakala || NEAT || FLO || align=right | 1.4 km || 
|-id=819 bgcolor=#fefefe
| 213819 ||  || — || August 21, 2003 || Palomar || NEAT || V || align=right data-sort-value="0.96" | 960 m || 
|-id=820 bgcolor=#fefefe
| 213820 ||  || — || August 22, 2003 || Palomar || NEAT || — || align=right | 1.2 km || 
|-id=821 bgcolor=#fefefe
| 213821 ||  || — || August 23, 2003 || Socorro || LINEAR || — || align=right | 1.1 km || 
|-id=822 bgcolor=#fefefe
| 213822 ||  || — || August 23, 2003 || Socorro || LINEAR || FLO || align=right | 1.7 km || 
|-id=823 bgcolor=#fefefe
| 213823 ||  || — || August 23, 2003 || Socorro || LINEAR || — || align=right | 1.3 km || 
|-id=824 bgcolor=#fefefe
| 213824 ||  || — || August 23, 2003 || Socorro || LINEAR || NYS || align=right | 1.0 km || 
|-id=825 bgcolor=#fefefe
| 213825 ||  || — || August 23, 2003 || Socorro || LINEAR || ERI || align=right | 3.4 km || 
|-id=826 bgcolor=#d6d6d6
| 213826 ||  || — || August 24, 2003 || Palomar || NEAT || EOS || align=right | 3.4 km || 
|-id=827 bgcolor=#fefefe
| 213827 ||  || — || August 24, 2003 || Socorro || LINEAR || FLO || align=right | 1.2 km || 
|-id=828 bgcolor=#fefefe
| 213828 ||  || — || August 24, 2003 || Socorro || LINEAR || FLO || align=right | 1.1 km || 
|-id=829 bgcolor=#fefefe
| 213829 ||  || — || August 24, 2003 || Socorro || LINEAR || — || align=right | 1.3 km || 
|-id=830 bgcolor=#fefefe
| 213830 ||  || — || August 24, 2003 || Socorro || LINEAR || NYS || align=right | 1.9 km || 
|-id=831 bgcolor=#fefefe
| 213831 ||  || — || August 30, 2003 || Consell || R. Pacheco || V || align=right data-sort-value="0.92" | 920 m || 
|-id=832 bgcolor=#fefefe
| 213832 ||  || — || August 28, 2003 || Haleakala || NEAT || FLO || align=right | 1.1 km || 
|-id=833 bgcolor=#fefefe
| 213833 ||  || — || August 29, 2003 || Socorro || LINEAR || V || align=right | 1.1 km || 
|-id=834 bgcolor=#d6d6d6
| 213834 ||  || — || August 31, 2003 || Kitt Peak || Spacewatch || KOR || align=right | 2.1 km || 
|-id=835 bgcolor=#fefefe
| 213835 ||  || — || August 31, 2003 || Socorro || LINEAR || slow || align=right data-sort-value="0.97" | 970 m || 
|-id=836 bgcolor=#fefefe
| 213836 ||  || — || September 14, 2003 || Haleakala || NEAT || NYS || align=right data-sort-value="0.97" | 970 m || 
|-id=837 bgcolor=#fefefe
| 213837 ||  || — || September 14, 2003 || Palomar || NEAT || — || align=right | 2.1 km || 
|-id=838 bgcolor=#fefefe
| 213838 ||  || — || September 4, 2003 || Kvistaberg || UDAS || — || align=right data-sort-value="0.99" | 990 m || 
|-id=839 bgcolor=#fefefe
| 213839 ||  || — || September 16, 2003 || Palomar || NEAT || NYS || align=right | 1.0 km || 
|-id=840 bgcolor=#fefefe
| 213840 ||  || — || September 16, 2003 || Kitt Peak || Spacewatch || — || align=right | 1.6 km || 
|-id=841 bgcolor=#fefefe
| 213841 ||  || — || September 16, 2003 || Palomar || NEAT || — || align=right | 1.3 km || 
|-id=842 bgcolor=#fefefe
| 213842 ||  || — || September 16, 2003 || Kitt Peak || Spacewatch || — || align=right data-sort-value="0.86" | 860 m || 
|-id=843 bgcolor=#fefefe
| 213843 ||  || — || September 16, 2003 || Kitt Peak || Spacewatch || MAS || align=right | 1.1 km || 
|-id=844 bgcolor=#fefefe
| 213844 ||  || — || September 18, 2003 || Palomar || NEAT || — || align=right | 1.4 km || 
|-id=845 bgcolor=#fefefe
| 213845 ||  || — || September 18, 2003 || Palomar || NEAT || — || align=right | 1.3 km || 
|-id=846 bgcolor=#fefefe
| 213846 ||  || — || September 18, 2003 || Palomar || NEAT || — || align=right | 1.2 km || 
|-id=847 bgcolor=#fefefe
| 213847 ||  || — || September 18, 2003 || Palomar || NEAT || V || align=right | 1.2 km || 
|-id=848 bgcolor=#fefefe
| 213848 ||  || — || September 16, 2003 || Anderson Mesa || LONEOS || V || align=right | 1.2 km || 
|-id=849 bgcolor=#FA8072
| 213849 ||  || — || September 16, 2003 || Anderson Mesa || LONEOS || — || align=right | 1.4 km || 
|-id=850 bgcolor=#fefefe
| 213850 ||  || — || September 16, 2003 || Anderson Mesa || LONEOS || FLO || align=right data-sort-value="0.95" | 950 m || 
|-id=851 bgcolor=#fefefe
| 213851 ||  || — || September 17, 2003 || Socorro || LINEAR || V || align=right | 1.1 km || 
|-id=852 bgcolor=#d6d6d6
| 213852 ||  || — || September 18, 2003 || Kitt Peak || Spacewatch || — || align=right | 3.5 km || 
|-id=853 bgcolor=#fefefe
| 213853 ||  || — || September 19, 2003 || Kitt Peak || Spacewatch || — || align=right | 1.3 km || 
|-id=854 bgcolor=#fefefe
| 213854 ||  || — || September 18, 2003 || Campo Imperatore || CINEOS || — || align=right | 1.1 km || 
|-id=855 bgcolor=#d6d6d6
| 213855 ||  || — || September 20, 2003 || Socorro || LINEAR || — || align=right | 4.7 km || 
|-id=856 bgcolor=#fefefe
| 213856 ||  || — || September 20, 2003 || Socorro || LINEAR || — || align=right | 1.4 km || 
|-id=857 bgcolor=#fefefe
| 213857 ||  || — || September 16, 2003 || Socorro || LINEAR || — || align=right | 1.6 km || 
|-id=858 bgcolor=#fefefe
| 213858 ||  || — || September 17, 2003 || Socorro || LINEAR || — || align=right | 1.4 km || 
|-id=859 bgcolor=#fefefe
| 213859 ||  || — || September 19, 2003 || Črni Vrh || Črni Vrh || V || align=right | 1.2 km || 
|-id=860 bgcolor=#fefefe
| 213860 ||  || — || September 18, 2003 || Kitt Peak || Spacewatch || — || align=right data-sort-value="0.98" | 980 m || 
|-id=861 bgcolor=#fefefe
| 213861 ||  || — || September 18, 2003 || Socorro || LINEAR || MAS || align=right | 1.1 km || 
|-id=862 bgcolor=#fefefe
| 213862 ||  || — || September 20, 2003 || Haleakala || NEAT || — || align=right | 1.5 km || 
|-id=863 bgcolor=#fefefe
| 213863 ||  || — || September 16, 2003 || Kitt Peak || Spacewatch || V || align=right | 1.2 km || 
|-id=864 bgcolor=#fefefe
| 213864 ||  || — || September 17, 2003 || Socorro || LINEAR || V || align=right | 1.2 km || 
|-id=865 bgcolor=#fefefe
| 213865 ||  || — || September 19, 2003 || Anderson Mesa || LONEOS || MAS || align=right | 1.3 km || 
|-id=866 bgcolor=#fefefe
| 213866 ||  || — || September 19, 2003 || Anderson Mesa || LONEOS || NYS || align=right | 1.3 km || 
|-id=867 bgcolor=#fefefe
| 213867 ||  || — || September 19, 2003 || Kitt Peak || Spacewatch || — || align=right | 2.8 km || 
|-id=868 bgcolor=#E9E9E9
| 213868 ||  || — || September 20, 2003 || Anderson Mesa || LONEOS || BRU || align=right | 3.5 km || 
|-id=869 bgcolor=#FFC2E0
| 213869 ||  || — || September 20, 2003 || Campo Imperatore || CINEOS || APO +1km || align=right | 1.0 km || 
|-id=870 bgcolor=#fefefe
| 213870 ||  || — || September 18, 2003 || Palomar || NEAT || — || align=right | 1.2 km || 
|-id=871 bgcolor=#fefefe
| 213871 ||  || — || September 19, 2003 || Palomar || NEAT || NYS || align=right | 1.1 km || 
|-id=872 bgcolor=#fefefe
| 213872 ||  || — || September 22, 2003 || Anderson Mesa || LONEOS || V || align=right | 1.2 km || 
|-id=873 bgcolor=#fefefe
| 213873 ||  || — || September 25, 2003 || Haleakala || NEAT || — || align=right | 1.3 km || 
|-id=874 bgcolor=#fefefe
| 213874 ||  || — || September 26, 2003 || Socorro || LINEAR || — || align=right | 1.5 km || 
|-id=875 bgcolor=#fefefe
| 213875 ||  || — || September 25, 2003 || Haleakala || NEAT || MAS || align=right | 1.4 km || 
|-id=876 bgcolor=#fefefe
| 213876 ||  || — || September 26, 2003 || Socorro || LINEAR || — || align=right | 1.0 km || 
|-id=877 bgcolor=#fefefe
| 213877 ||  || — || September 26, 2003 || Socorro || LINEAR || — || align=right | 1.2 km || 
|-id=878 bgcolor=#fefefe
| 213878 ||  || — || September 26, 2003 || Socorro || LINEAR || — || align=right | 1.2 km || 
|-id=879 bgcolor=#fefefe
| 213879 ||  || — || September 26, 2003 || Socorro || LINEAR || FLO || align=right data-sort-value="0.87" | 870 m || 
|-id=880 bgcolor=#fefefe
| 213880 ||  || — || September 26, 2003 || Socorro || LINEAR || MAS || align=right | 1.3 km || 
|-id=881 bgcolor=#fefefe
| 213881 ||  || — || September 26, 2003 || Socorro || LINEAR || — || align=right | 1.3 km || 
|-id=882 bgcolor=#fefefe
| 213882 ||  || — || September 26, 2003 || Socorro || LINEAR || — || align=right | 1.6 km || 
|-id=883 bgcolor=#fefefe
| 213883 ||  || — || September 28, 2003 || Socorro || LINEAR || V || align=right data-sort-value="0.98" | 980 m || 
|-id=884 bgcolor=#fefefe
| 213884 ||  || — || September 24, 2003 || Haleakala || NEAT || V || align=right data-sort-value="0.67" | 670 m || 
|-id=885 bgcolor=#fefefe
| 213885 ||  || — || September 25, 2003 || Palomar || NEAT || V || align=right | 1.0 km || 
|-id=886 bgcolor=#fefefe
| 213886 ||  || — || September 25, 2003 || Haleakala || NEAT || FLO || align=right data-sort-value="0.85" | 850 m || 
|-id=887 bgcolor=#fefefe
| 213887 ||  || — || September 29, 2003 || Socorro || LINEAR || — || align=right data-sort-value="0.73" | 730 m || 
|-id=888 bgcolor=#fefefe
| 213888 ||  || — || September 28, 2003 || Socorro || LINEAR || SUL || align=right | 2.6 km || 
|-id=889 bgcolor=#fefefe
| 213889 ||  || — || September 17, 2003 || Palomar || NEAT || V || align=right | 1.1 km || 
|-id=890 bgcolor=#fefefe
| 213890 ||  || — || September 17, 2003 || Palomar || NEAT || NYS || align=right | 1.2 km || 
|-id=891 bgcolor=#E9E9E9
| 213891 ||  || — || September 28, 2003 || Socorro || LINEAR || — || align=right | 3.1 km || 
|-id=892 bgcolor=#fefefe
| 213892 ||  || — || September 22, 2003 || Kitt Peak || Spacewatch || — || align=right | 1.2 km || 
|-id=893 bgcolor=#fefefe
| 213893 ||  || — || October 7, 2003 || Wrightwood || J. W. Young || NYS || align=right | 1.1 km || 
|-id=894 bgcolor=#E9E9E9
| 213894 ||  || — || October 8, 2003 || Wrightwood || J. W. Young || — || align=right | 1.6 km || 
|-id=895 bgcolor=#FA8072
| 213895 ||  || — || October 1, 2003 || Anderson Mesa || LONEOS || — || align=right | 1.2 km || 
|-id=896 bgcolor=#fefefe
| 213896 ||  || — || October 5, 2003 || Kitt Peak || Spacewatch || V || align=right data-sort-value="0.65" | 650 m || 
|-id=897 bgcolor=#fefefe
| 213897 ||  || — || October 16, 2003 || Kitt Peak || Spacewatch || — || align=right | 1.1 km || 
|-id=898 bgcolor=#fefefe
| 213898 ||  || — || October 16, 2003 || Haleakala || NEAT || NYS || align=right | 3.3 km || 
|-id=899 bgcolor=#fefefe
| 213899 ||  || — || October 21, 2003 || Socorro || LINEAR || — || align=right | 1.1 km || 
|-id=900 bgcolor=#fefefe
| 213900 ||  || — || October 17, 2003 || Kitt Peak || Spacewatch || — || align=right | 1.1 km || 
|}

213901–214000 

|-bgcolor=#fefefe
| 213901 ||  || — || October 16, 2003 || Anderson Mesa || LONEOS || V || align=right | 1.1 km || 
|-id=902 bgcolor=#fefefe
| 213902 ||  || — || October 16, 2003 || Anderson Mesa || LONEOS || — || align=right | 1.4 km || 
|-id=903 bgcolor=#E9E9E9
| 213903 ||  || — || October 16, 2003 || Palomar || NEAT || — || align=right | 3.9 km || 
|-id=904 bgcolor=#fefefe
| 213904 ||  || — || October 16, 2003 || Anderson Mesa || LONEOS || V || align=right data-sort-value="0.98" | 980 m || 
|-id=905 bgcolor=#fefefe
| 213905 ||  || — || October 16, 2003 || Anderson Mesa || LONEOS || V || align=right | 1.0 km || 
|-id=906 bgcolor=#fefefe
| 213906 ||  || — || October 16, 2003 || Anderson Mesa || LONEOS || — || align=right | 1.6 km || 
|-id=907 bgcolor=#fefefe
| 213907 ||  || — || October 16, 2003 || Palomar || NEAT || V || align=right | 1.0 km || 
|-id=908 bgcolor=#E9E9E9
| 213908 ||  || — || October 19, 2003 || Kitt Peak || Spacewatch || — || align=right | 1.2 km || 
|-id=909 bgcolor=#fefefe
| 213909 ||  || — || October 18, 2003 || Kitt Peak || Spacewatch || — || align=right | 1.0 km || 
|-id=910 bgcolor=#fefefe
| 213910 ||  || — || October 19, 2003 || Anderson Mesa || LONEOS || V || align=right | 1.2 km || 
|-id=911 bgcolor=#E9E9E9
| 213911 ||  || — || October 20, 2003 || Socorro || LINEAR || — || align=right | 1.4 km || 
|-id=912 bgcolor=#fefefe
| 213912 ||  || — || October 20, 2003 || Palomar || NEAT || — || align=right | 1.2 km || 
|-id=913 bgcolor=#fefefe
| 213913 ||  || — || October 20, 2003 || Palomar || NEAT || V || align=right | 1.1 km || 
|-id=914 bgcolor=#fefefe
| 213914 ||  || — || October 20, 2003 || Socorro || LINEAR || V || align=right | 1.1 km || 
|-id=915 bgcolor=#fefefe
| 213915 ||  || — || October 21, 2003 || Socorro || LINEAR || — || align=right | 2.5 km || 
|-id=916 bgcolor=#fefefe
| 213916 ||  || — || October 20, 2003 || Socorro || LINEAR || FLO || align=right data-sort-value="0.93" | 930 m || 
|-id=917 bgcolor=#fefefe
| 213917 ||  || — || October 20, 2003 || Socorro || LINEAR || — || align=right | 1.1 km || 
|-id=918 bgcolor=#E9E9E9
| 213918 ||  || — || October 21, 2003 || Palomar || NEAT || — || align=right | 1.2 km || 
|-id=919 bgcolor=#fefefe
| 213919 ||  || — || October 21, 2003 || Socorro || LINEAR || V || align=right | 1.2 km || 
|-id=920 bgcolor=#fefefe
| 213920 ||  || — || October 21, 2003 || Palomar || NEAT || — || align=right | 1.2 km || 
|-id=921 bgcolor=#E9E9E9
| 213921 ||  || — || October 21, 2003 || Kitt Peak || Spacewatch || — || align=right | 1.3 km || 
|-id=922 bgcolor=#fefefe
| 213922 ||  || — || October 21, 2003 || Socorro || LINEAR || NYS || align=right | 2.7 km || 
|-id=923 bgcolor=#d6d6d6
| 213923 ||  || — || October 22, 2003 || Socorro || LINEAR || — || align=right | 3.9 km || 
|-id=924 bgcolor=#d6d6d6
| 213924 ||  || — || October 21, 2003 || Socorro || LINEAR || EMA || align=right | 4.7 km || 
|-id=925 bgcolor=#d6d6d6
| 213925 ||  || — || October 22, 2003 || Socorro || LINEAR || — || align=right | 4.2 km || 
|-id=926 bgcolor=#fefefe
| 213926 ||  || — || October 25, 2003 || Socorro || LINEAR || V || align=right | 1.1 km || 
|-id=927 bgcolor=#E9E9E9
| 213927 ||  || — || October 27, 2003 || Kitt Peak || Spacewatch || — || align=right | 2.2 km || 
|-id=928 bgcolor=#E9E9E9
| 213928 ||  || — || October 29, 2003 || Haleakala || NEAT || — || align=right | 1.3 km || 
|-id=929 bgcolor=#fefefe
| 213929 ||  || — || October 29, 2003 || Socorro || LINEAR || V || align=right data-sort-value="0.95" | 950 m || 
|-id=930 bgcolor=#d6d6d6
| 213930 ||  || — || October 17, 2003 || Anderson Mesa || LONEOS || EOS || align=right | 3.0 km || 
|-id=931 bgcolor=#E9E9E9
| 213931 ||  || — || October 21, 2003 || Socorro || LINEAR || — || align=right | 1.8 km || 
|-id=932 bgcolor=#fefefe
| 213932 ||  || — || October 22, 2003 || Apache Point || SDSS || — || align=right data-sort-value="0.94" | 940 m || 
|-id=933 bgcolor=#fefefe
| 213933 ||  || — || October 23, 2003 || Apache Point || SDSS || NYS || align=right data-sort-value="0.88" | 880 m || 
|-id=934 bgcolor=#fefefe
| 213934 ||  || — || October 19, 2003 || Kitt Peak || Spacewatch || — || align=right | 1.4 km || 
|-id=935 bgcolor=#fefefe
| 213935 ||  || — || November 15, 2003 || Kitt Peak || Spacewatch || — || align=right | 1.2 km || 
|-id=936 bgcolor=#fefefe
| 213936 ||  || — || November 15, 2003 || Kitt Peak || Spacewatch || — || align=right data-sort-value="0.98" | 980 m || 
|-id=937 bgcolor=#E9E9E9
| 213937 ||  || — || November 19, 2003 || Socorro || LINEAR || — || align=right | 1.4 km || 
|-id=938 bgcolor=#E9E9E9
| 213938 ||  || — || November 20, 2003 || Socorro || LINEAR || — || align=right | 1.5 km || 
|-id=939 bgcolor=#E9E9E9
| 213939 ||  || — || November 19, 2003 || Kitt Peak || Spacewatch || JUN || align=right | 1.3 km || 
|-id=940 bgcolor=#E9E9E9
| 213940 ||  || — || November 20, 2003 || Socorro || LINEAR || — || align=right | 1.1 km || 
|-id=941 bgcolor=#fefefe
| 213941 ||  || — || November 20, 2003 || Socorro || LINEAR || — || align=right | 1.5 km || 
|-id=942 bgcolor=#E9E9E9
| 213942 ||  || — || November 20, 2003 || Socorro || LINEAR || — || align=right | 4.4 km || 
|-id=943 bgcolor=#E9E9E9
| 213943 ||  || — || November 19, 2003 || Socorro || LINEAR || — || align=right | 4.0 km || 
|-id=944 bgcolor=#fefefe
| 213944 ||  || — || November 20, 2003 || Catalina || CSS || KLI || align=right | 2.9 km || 
|-id=945 bgcolor=#fefefe
| 213945 ||  || — || November 18, 2003 || Palomar || NEAT || NYS || align=right | 1.1 km || 
|-id=946 bgcolor=#E9E9E9
| 213946 ||  || — || November 23, 2003 || Kitt Peak || Spacewatch || — || align=right | 1.5 km || 
|-id=947 bgcolor=#E9E9E9
| 213947 ||  || — || November 20, 2003 || Socorro || LINEAR || — || align=right | 1.5 km || 
|-id=948 bgcolor=#FA8072
| 213948 ||  || — || November 20, 2003 || Socorro || LINEAR || — || align=right | 2.2 km || 
|-id=949 bgcolor=#E9E9E9
| 213949 ||  || — || November 20, 2003 || Socorro || LINEAR || — || align=right | 2.3 km || 
|-id=950 bgcolor=#E9E9E9
| 213950 ||  || — || November 21, 2003 || Socorro || LINEAR || — || align=right | 1.4 km || 
|-id=951 bgcolor=#fefefe
| 213951 ||  || — || November 19, 2003 || Palomar || NEAT || V || align=right | 1.1 km || 
|-id=952 bgcolor=#E9E9E9
| 213952 ||  || — || November 19, 2003 || Kitt Peak || Spacewatch || — || align=right | 1.2 km || 
|-id=953 bgcolor=#fefefe
| 213953 ||  || — || December 14, 2003 || Palomar || NEAT || V || align=right | 1.2 km || 
|-id=954 bgcolor=#fefefe
| 213954 ||  || — || December 1, 2003 || Kitt Peak || Spacewatch || — || align=right | 1.1 km || 
|-id=955 bgcolor=#E9E9E9
| 213955 ||  || — || December 15, 2003 || Socorro || LINEAR || MAR || align=right | 1.7 km || 
|-id=956 bgcolor=#E9E9E9
| 213956 ||  || — || December 17, 2003 || Socorro || LINEAR || — || align=right | 3.1 km || 
|-id=957 bgcolor=#E9E9E9
| 213957 ||  || — || December 17, 2003 || Kitt Peak || Spacewatch || — || align=right | 1.9 km || 
|-id=958 bgcolor=#E9E9E9
| 213958 ||  || — || December 17, 2003 || Kitt Peak || Spacewatch || INO || align=right | 1.8 km || 
|-id=959 bgcolor=#E9E9E9
| 213959 ||  || — || December 17, 2003 || Kitt Peak || Spacewatch || — || align=right | 2.1 km || 
|-id=960 bgcolor=#E9E9E9
| 213960 ||  || — || December 18, 2003 || Socorro || LINEAR || — || align=right | 2.1 km || 
|-id=961 bgcolor=#E9E9E9
| 213961 ||  || — || December 18, 2003 || Socorro || LINEAR || — || align=right | 2.3 km || 
|-id=962 bgcolor=#E9E9E9
| 213962 ||  || — || December 17, 2003 || Kitt Peak || Spacewatch || — || align=right | 1.6 km || 
|-id=963 bgcolor=#E9E9E9
| 213963 ||  || — || December 16, 2003 || Anderson Mesa || LONEOS || — || align=right | 3.4 km || 
|-id=964 bgcolor=#E9E9E9
| 213964 ||  || — || December 19, 2003 || Socorro || LINEAR || — || align=right | 2.3 km || 
|-id=965 bgcolor=#E9E9E9
| 213965 ||  || — || December 18, 2003 || Socorro || LINEAR || — || align=right | 1.4 km || 
|-id=966 bgcolor=#E9E9E9
| 213966 ||  || — || December 19, 2003 || Kitt Peak || Spacewatch || MRX || align=right | 1.6 km || 
|-id=967 bgcolor=#fefefe
| 213967 ||  || — || December 19, 2003 || Socorro || LINEAR || — || align=right | 1.6 km || 
|-id=968 bgcolor=#E9E9E9
| 213968 ||  || — || December 23, 2003 || Socorro || LINEAR || — || align=right | 2.2 km || 
|-id=969 bgcolor=#E9E9E9
| 213969 ||  || — || December 27, 2003 || Socorro || LINEAR || — || align=right | 1.8 km || 
|-id=970 bgcolor=#E9E9E9
| 213970 ||  || — || December 28, 2003 || Socorro || LINEAR || ADE || align=right | 4.3 km || 
|-id=971 bgcolor=#E9E9E9
| 213971 ||  || — || December 27, 2003 || Socorro || LINEAR || — || align=right | 2.2 km || 
|-id=972 bgcolor=#E9E9E9
| 213972 ||  || — || December 28, 2003 || Socorro || LINEAR || EUN || align=right | 2.0 km || 
|-id=973 bgcolor=#d6d6d6
| 213973 ||  || — || December 28, 2003 || Socorro || LINEAR || — || align=right | 5.2 km || 
|-id=974 bgcolor=#E9E9E9
| 213974 ||  || — || December 28, 2003 || Socorro || LINEAR || — || align=right | 1.8 km || 
|-id=975 bgcolor=#E9E9E9
| 213975 ||  || — || December 28, 2003 || Socorro || LINEAR || EUN || align=right | 2.1 km || 
|-id=976 bgcolor=#E9E9E9
| 213976 ||  || — || December 28, 2003 || Socorro || LINEAR || — || align=right | 2.4 km || 
|-id=977 bgcolor=#E9E9E9
| 213977 ||  || — || December 29, 2003 || Anderson Mesa || LONEOS || — || align=right | 2.8 km || 
|-id=978 bgcolor=#E9E9E9
| 213978 ||  || — || December 29, 2003 || Catalina || CSS || JUN || align=right | 1.3 km || 
|-id=979 bgcolor=#E9E9E9
| 213979 ||  || — || December 29, 2003 || Catalina || CSS || EUN || align=right | 2.1 km || 
|-id=980 bgcolor=#E9E9E9
| 213980 ||  || — || December 18, 2003 || Socorro || LINEAR || — || align=right | 1.9 km || 
|-id=981 bgcolor=#E9E9E9
| 213981 ||  || — || December 28, 2003 || Socorro || LINEAR || CLO || align=right | 3.5 km || 
|-id=982 bgcolor=#E9E9E9
| 213982 ||  || — || January 13, 2004 || Anderson Mesa || LONEOS || — || align=right | 4.1 km || 
|-id=983 bgcolor=#E9E9E9
| 213983 ||  || — || January 15, 2004 || Kitt Peak || Spacewatch || — || align=right | 2.2 km || 
|-id=984 bgcolor=#fefefe
| 213984 ||  || — || January 15, 2004 || Kitt Peak || Spacewatch || — || align=right | 1.0 km || 
|-id=985 bgcolor=#E9E9E9
| 213985 ||  || — || January 16, 2004 || Palomar || NEAT || — || align=right | 4.6 km || 
|-id=986 bgcolor=#E9E9E9
| 213986 ||  || — || January 16, 2004 || Palomar || NEAT || — || align=right | 3.4 km || 
|-id=987 bgcolor=#E9E9E9
| 213987 ||  || — || January 16, 2004 || Palomar || NEAT || — || align=right | 2.4 km || 
|-id=988 bgcolor=#E9E9E9
| 213988 ||  || — || January 17, 2004 || Palomar || NEAT || — || align=right | 2.0 km || 
|-id=989 bgcolor=#E9E9E9
| 213989 ||  || — || January 18, 2004 || Catalina || CSS || — || align=right | 4.0 km || 
|-id=990 bgcolor=#E9E9E9
| 213990 ||  || — || January 16, 2004 || Mount Graham || W. H. Ryan || — || align=right | 3.7 km || 
|-id=991 bgcolor=#E9E9E9
| 213991 ||  || — || January 21, 2004 || Socorro || LINEAR || — || align=right | 3.6 km || 
|-id=992 bgcolor=#d6d6d6
| 213992 ||  || — || January 22, 2004 || Socorro || LINEAR || — || align=right | 3.4 km || 
|-id=993 bgcolor=#E9E9E9
| 213993 ||  || — || January 21, 2004 || Socorro || LINEAR || — || align=right | 1.1 km || 
|-id=994 bgcolor=#E9E9E9
| 213994 ||  || — || January 21, 2004 || Socorro || LINEAR || — || align=right | 2.4 km || 
|-id=995 bgcolor=#E9E9E9
| 213995 ||  || — || January 25, 2004 || Haleakala || NEAT || — || align=right | 1.5 km || 
|-id=996 bgcolor=#E9E9E9
| 213996 ||  || — || January 23, 2004 || Socorro || LINEAR || GEF || align=right | 2.0 km || 
|-id=997 bgcolor=#E9E9E9
| 213997 ||  || — || January 26, 2004 || Anderson Mesa || LONEOS || — || align=right | 2.3 km || 
|-id=998 bgcolor=#E9E9E9
| 213998 ||  || — || January 23, 2004 || Socorro || LINEAR || — || align=right | 1.9 km || 
|-id=999 bgcolor=#E9E9E9
| 213999 ||  || — || January 23, 2004 || Socorro || LINEAR || — || align=right | 3.4 km || 
|-id=000 bgcolor=#E9E9E9
| 214000 ||  || — || January 28, 2004 || Catalina || CSS || BRU || align=right | 3.9 km || 
|}

References

External links 
 Discovery Circumstances: Numbered Minor Planets (210001)–(215000) (IAU Minor Planet Center)

0213